= Bundeena =

- Suburb
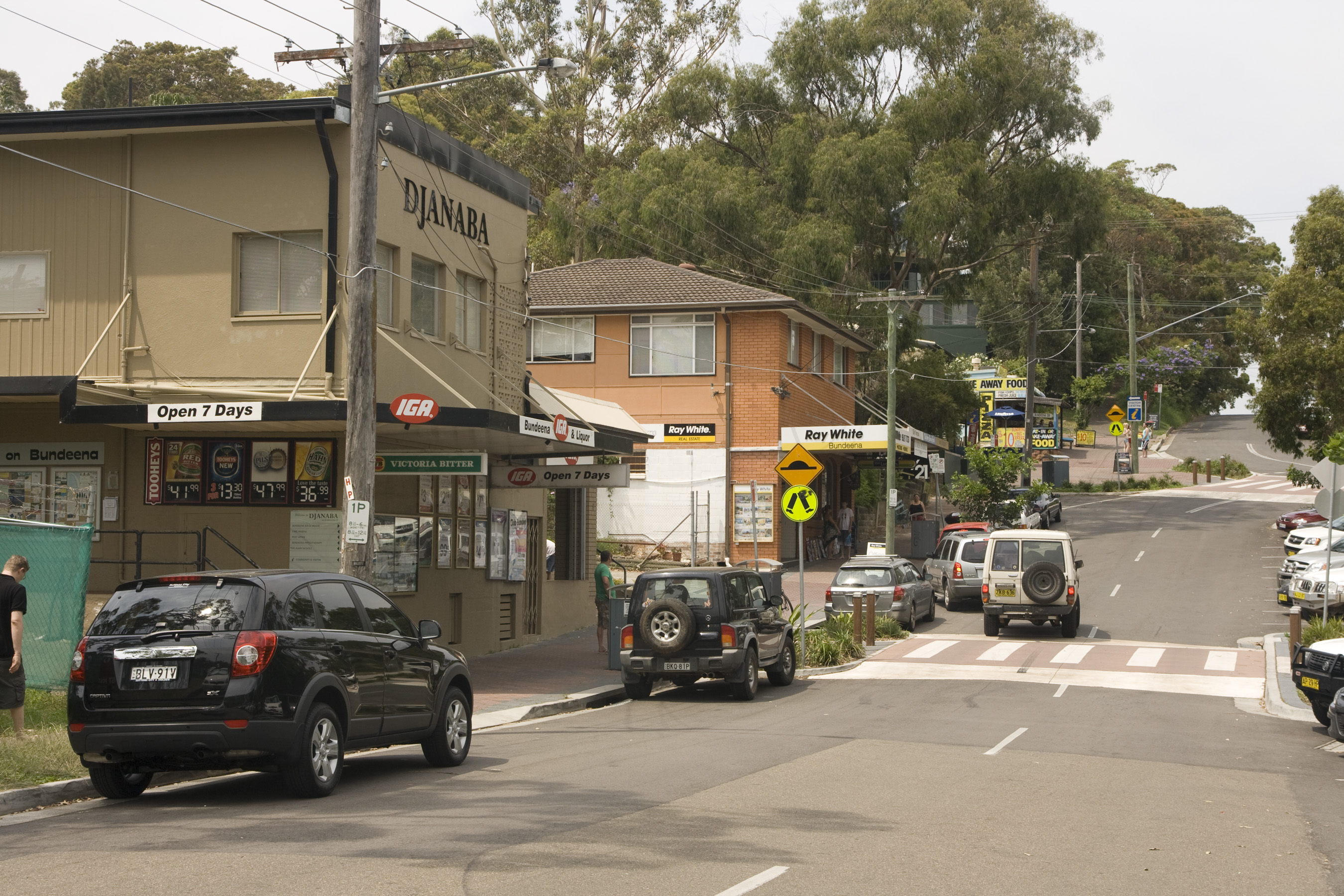
- Town centre, November 2009

- Interactive map of Bundeena
- Coordinates: 34°5′17.02″S 151°9′14.62″E
- Country: Australia
- State: New South Wales
- City: Sydney
- LGA: Sutherland Shire
- Location: 29 km (18 mi) south of Sydney CBD

Government
  - State electorate: Heathcote
  - Federal division: Hughes

Area
  - Total: 1.9 km^{2} (0.73 sq mi)
- Elevation: 16 m (52 ft)

Population
  - Total: 2,103 (2021 census)
  - Density: 1,107/km^{2} (2,870/sq mi)
- Postcode: 2230
Suburbs around Bundeena
Burraneer	Cronulla
Maianbar	Bundeena	Tasman Sea
	Royal National Park

Bundeena is a beachside village and suburb on the outskirts of southern Sydney, in the state of New South Wales, Australia. Bundeena is located 29 kilometres (18 miles) south of the Sydney central business district and is part of the local government area of the Sutherland Shire.

Bundeena is adjacent to the village of Maianbar and lies on the southern side of Port Hacking, opposite the suburbs of Cronulla and Burraneer. The village is surrounded by the Royal National Park. The town is the home of several of Australia's best-known artists.

The beaches at Bundeena are Jibbon Beach, Gunyah Beach, Horderns Beach and Bonnie Vale Beach. Cabbage Tree Creek and 'The Basin' separate Bundeena from the smaller village of Maianbar. A bush track and footbridge link the two villages. Bonnie Vale is also one of the few camp grounds within the Royal National Park.

== Transport ==
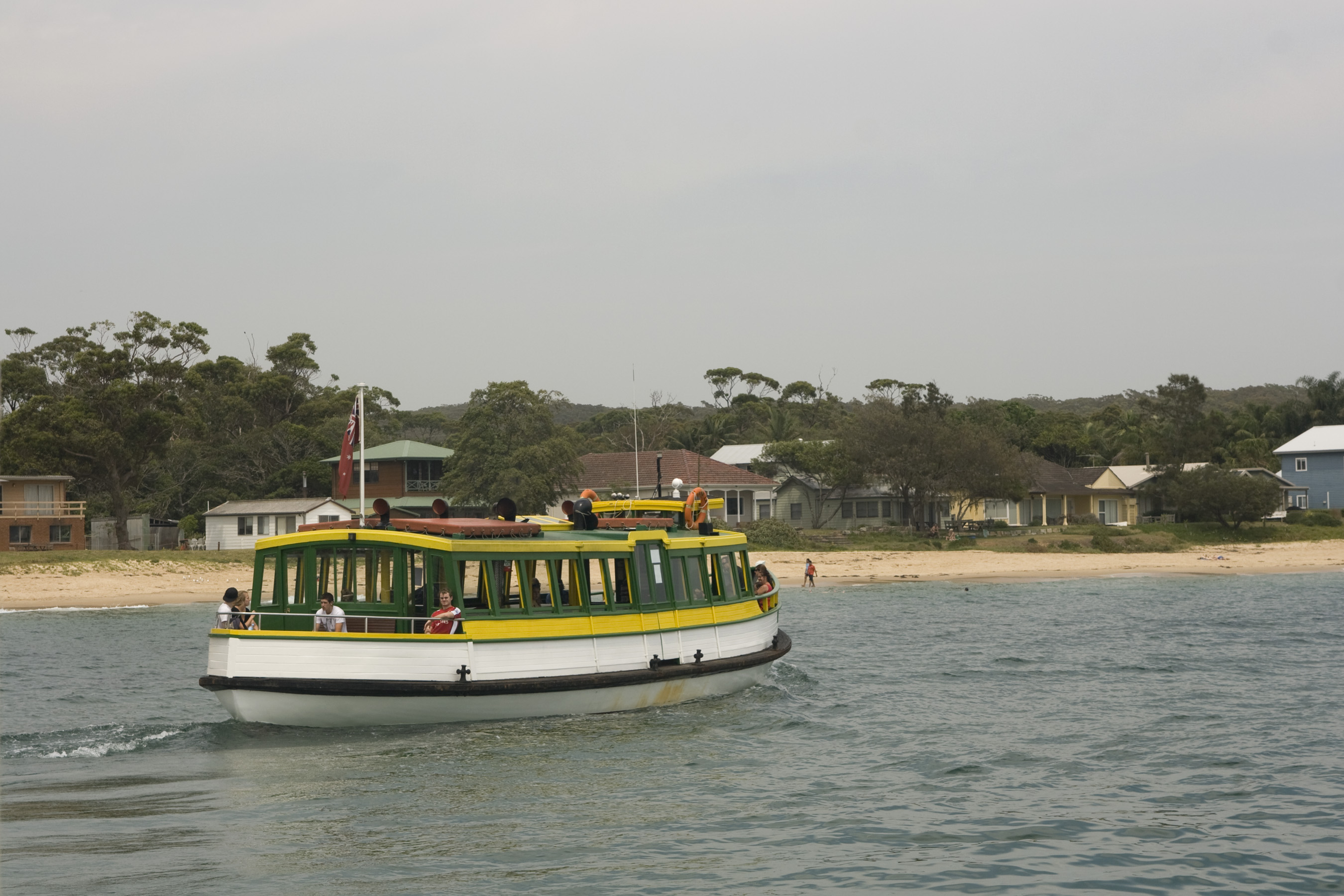
Passenger ferry from Cronulla

Bundeena may be reached by passenger ferry from Cronulla or by road through the Royal National Park from Sutherland or Waterfall. Cronulla and National Park Ferry Cruises provides regular ferry services between Cronulla and Bundeena. The wharf at Cronulla is located on Gunnamatta Bay, near Cronulla railway station. Ferry trips vary from 20 to 30 minutes depending on the weather. Many people from Bundeena drive to the railway station at Sutherland, as it is only a 25-minute drive as opposed to 30 minutes by ferry to Cronulla and then a 15-minute train trip to Sutherland.

Maianbar Bundeena Bus Service operates bus route 989 for local bus services between Bundeena and Maianbar on school days only. In addition there is one return trip every Wednesday to Engadine and one return trip every Friday to Miranda both via Maianbar.

== Environment ==
During early colonial settlement, Indonesian rusa deer were introduced and have since become a large population in the area. Many residents see the deer as pests, but they are a protected species, although the National Parks & Wildlife Service are permitted a small yearly cull. However many residents also take delight in the deer, which causes much division and emotion in the affected townships.

== History ==
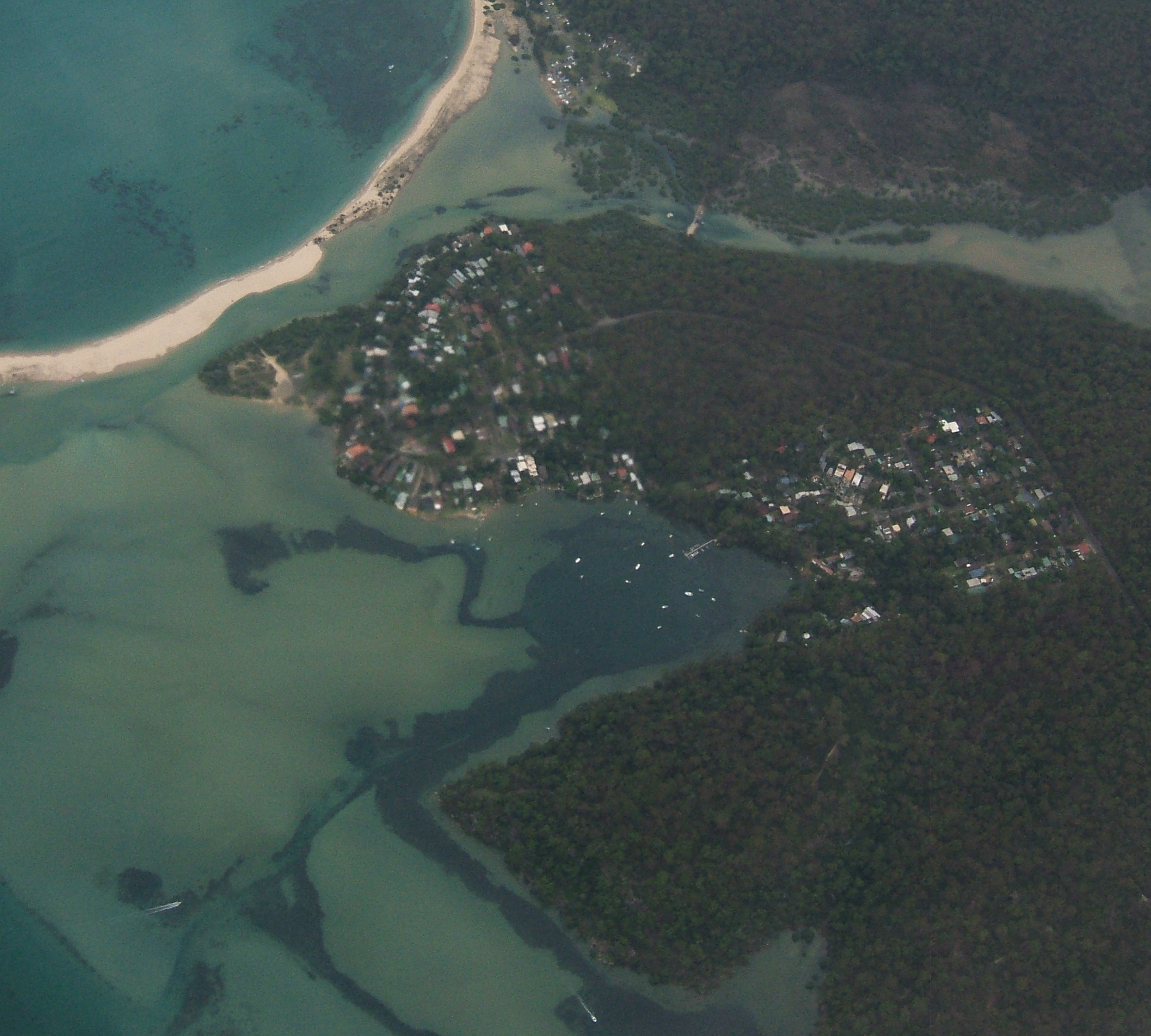
Aerial image looking to the south-east. The three peninsulas, from left to right, are Yenabilli, Maianbar and Bundeena

Bundeena is an Aboriginal word meaning "noise like thunder" (presumed to be a reference to the sound of the waves crashing on Horderns Beach). Aboriginal rock engravings made by Dharawal people can be found at Jibbon Head.

Bass and Flinders investigated the area in 1796, deciding that it was not a suitable location for a settlement. In 1815 there were reports of criminals in the Cabbage Tree Creek region who were producing sly grog. They used the caves along the foreshore for storage.

Bundeena's first authorised white settler, Owen Byrne, was granted land at the site in 1832. George Simpson received a land grant at the adjacent Bonnie Vale in 1863. Simpson's Hotel was opened in the area now known as Simpsons Bay by George's son, William, in the 1870s. The sandstone Simpson's House (1870s) is still standing at what is now Bonnie Vale Campground.

A wharf was built in 1890 and W.A. Hodgkinson conducted a launch service from Gunnamatta Bay in 1908. Captain R.R. Ryall commenced the Cronulla to Bundeena ferry service in 1915. The Wharf was reconstructed in 1920. The district's first store commenced operations at the beginning of the 1930s. Bundeena Public School opened on 14 September 1948.

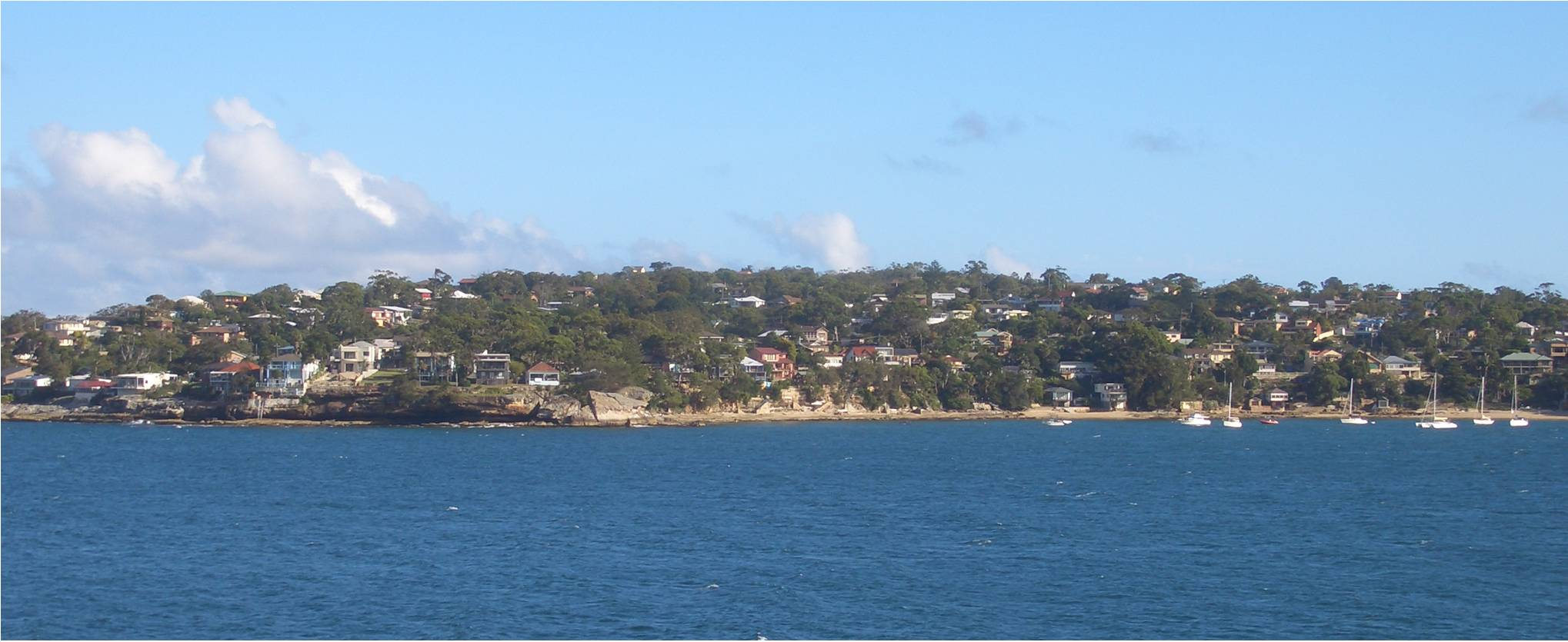
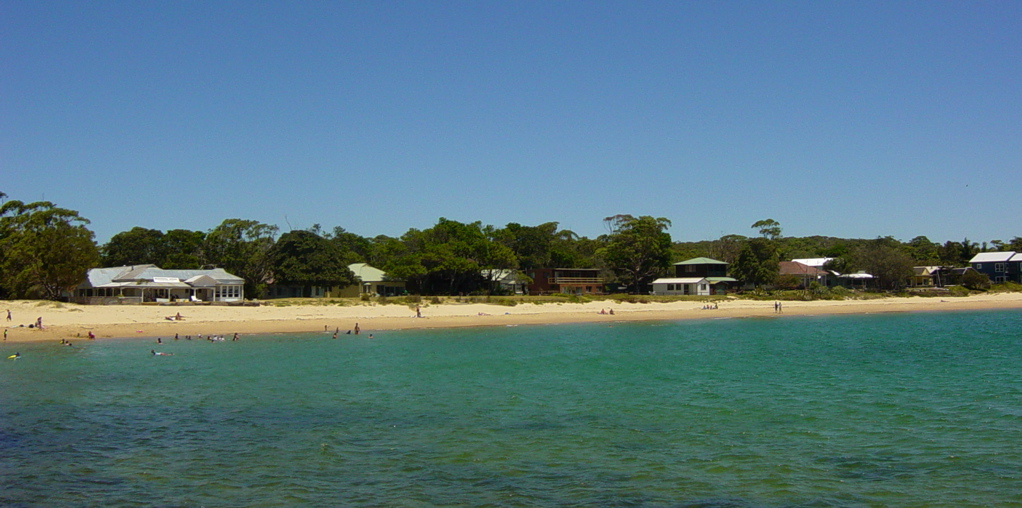
Horderns Beach, Bundeena. As viewed from Bundeena ferry wharf.

Several famous artists live in Bundeena, Including Garry Shead, George Gittoes and Shen Jiawei.

== Education ==
Bundeena Public School began in September 1948, with classes initially held in the RSL hall. Bundeena Library operates out of Bundeena Public School on Mondays and Wednesdays after school hours and Saturday mornings.

== Sport ==
Bundeena is home to the soccer club Bundeena-Mainbar FC, who play at Bundeena Oval. Bundeena Oval also hosts Bundeena Little Athletics.

== Demographics ==
According to the 2021 census of Population, there were 2,103 residents in Bundeena. 73.5% of people were born in Australia. The next most common country of birth was England at 6.7%. 88.6% of people only spoke English at home. The most common responses for religion were No Religion 48.3%, Catholic 18.8% and Anglican 13.0%.

== Gallery ==
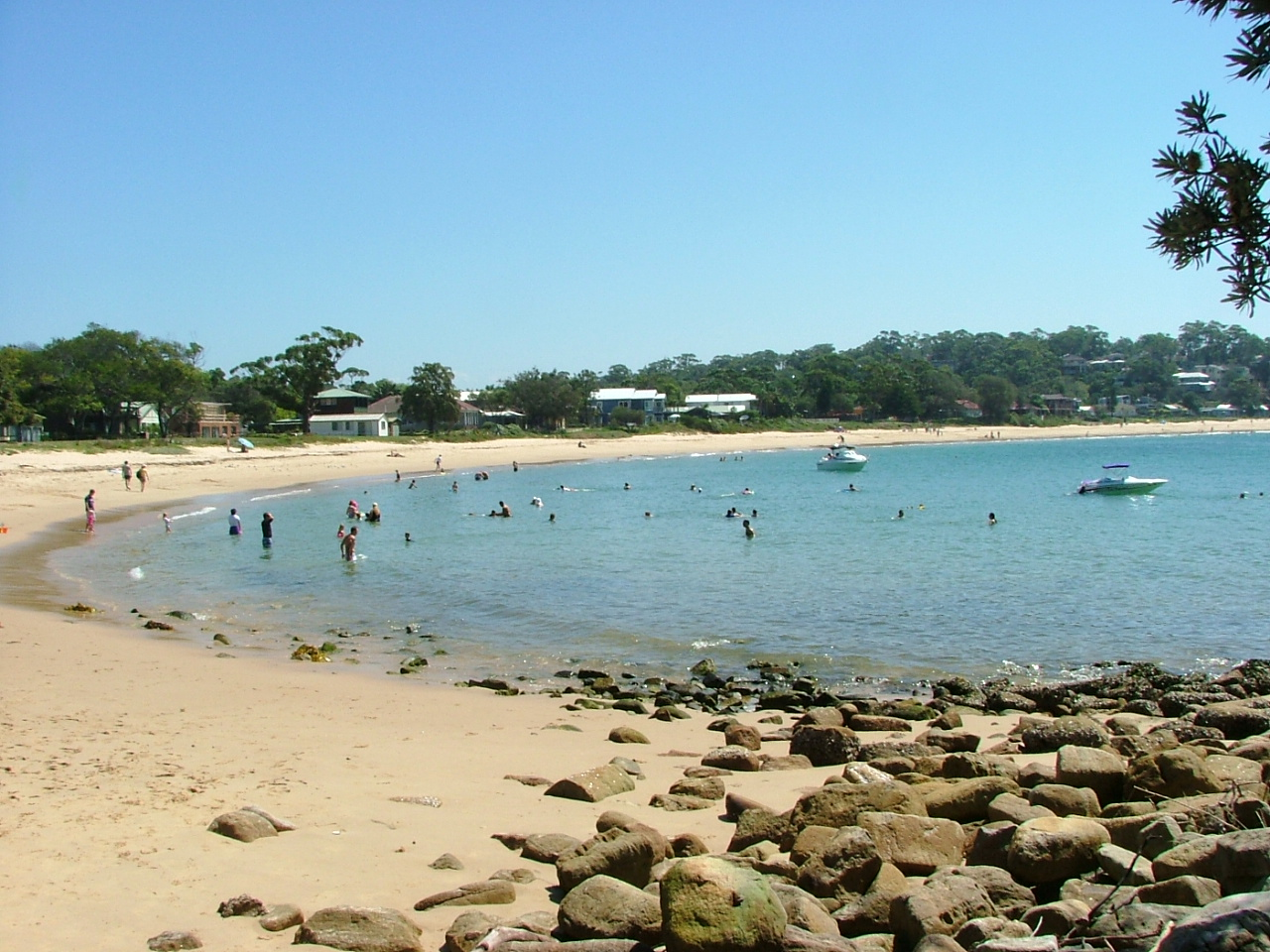
Bundeena Beach

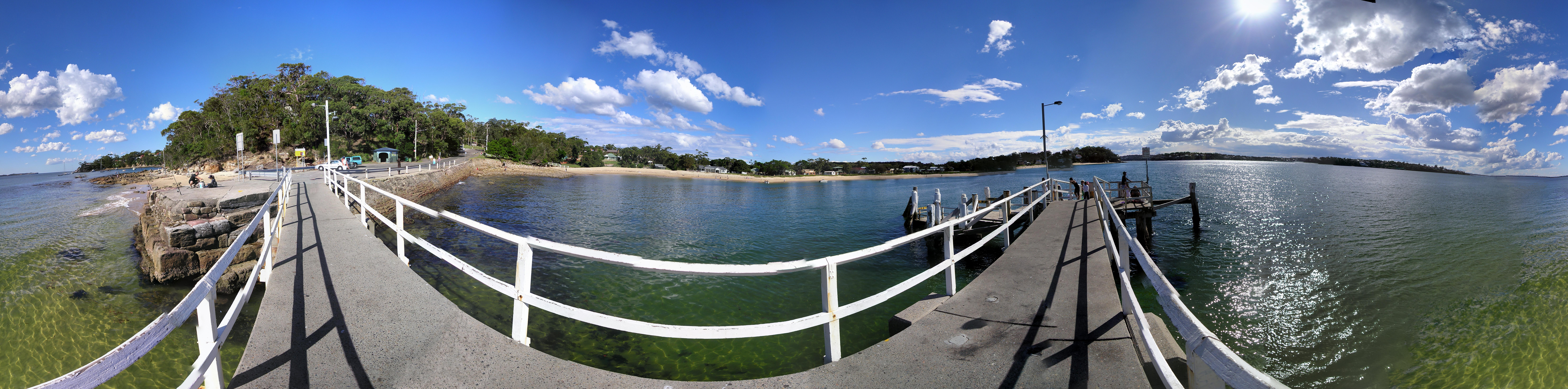
360-degree panorama of the Bundeena ferry pier

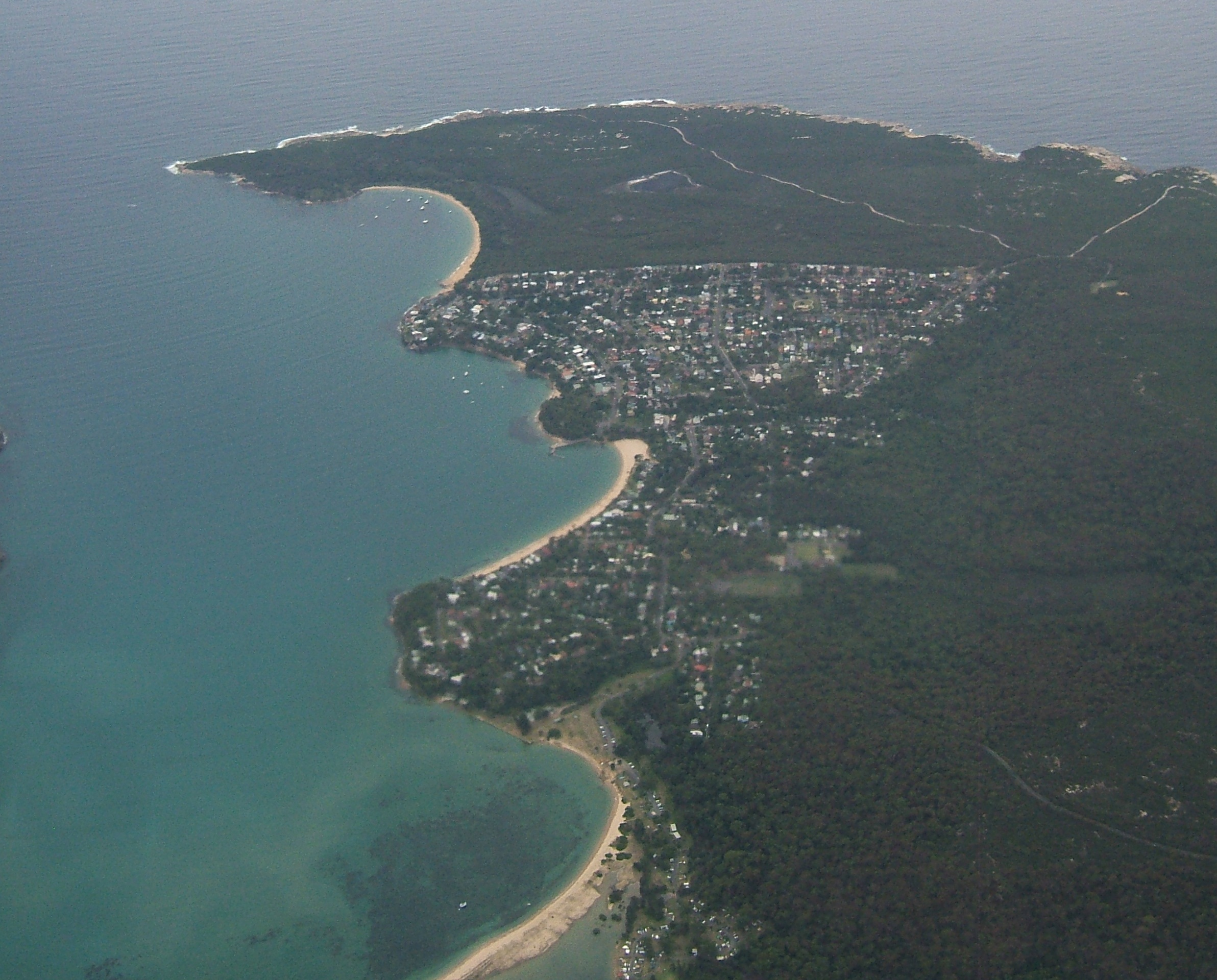
Aerial view of Bundeena and Port Hacking

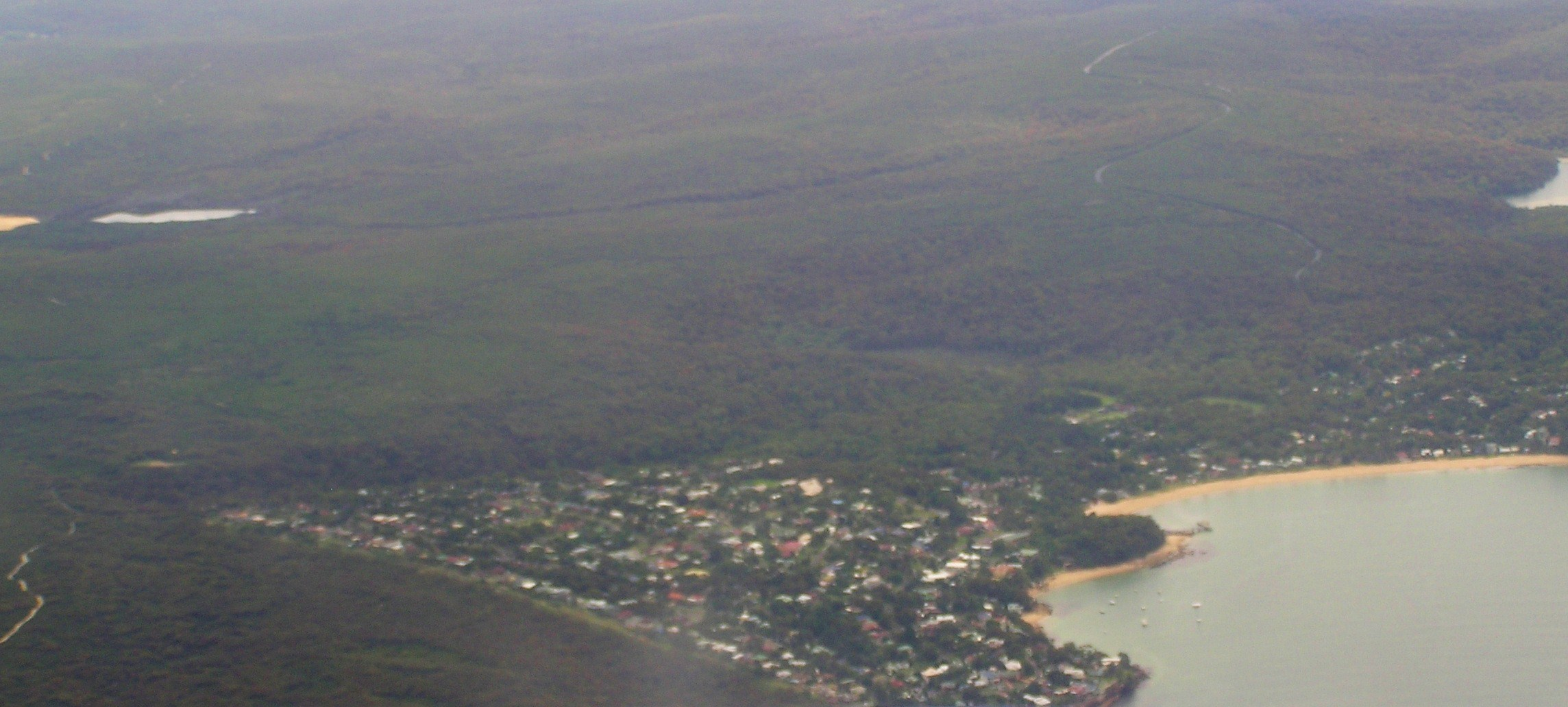
Aerial view of Bundeena

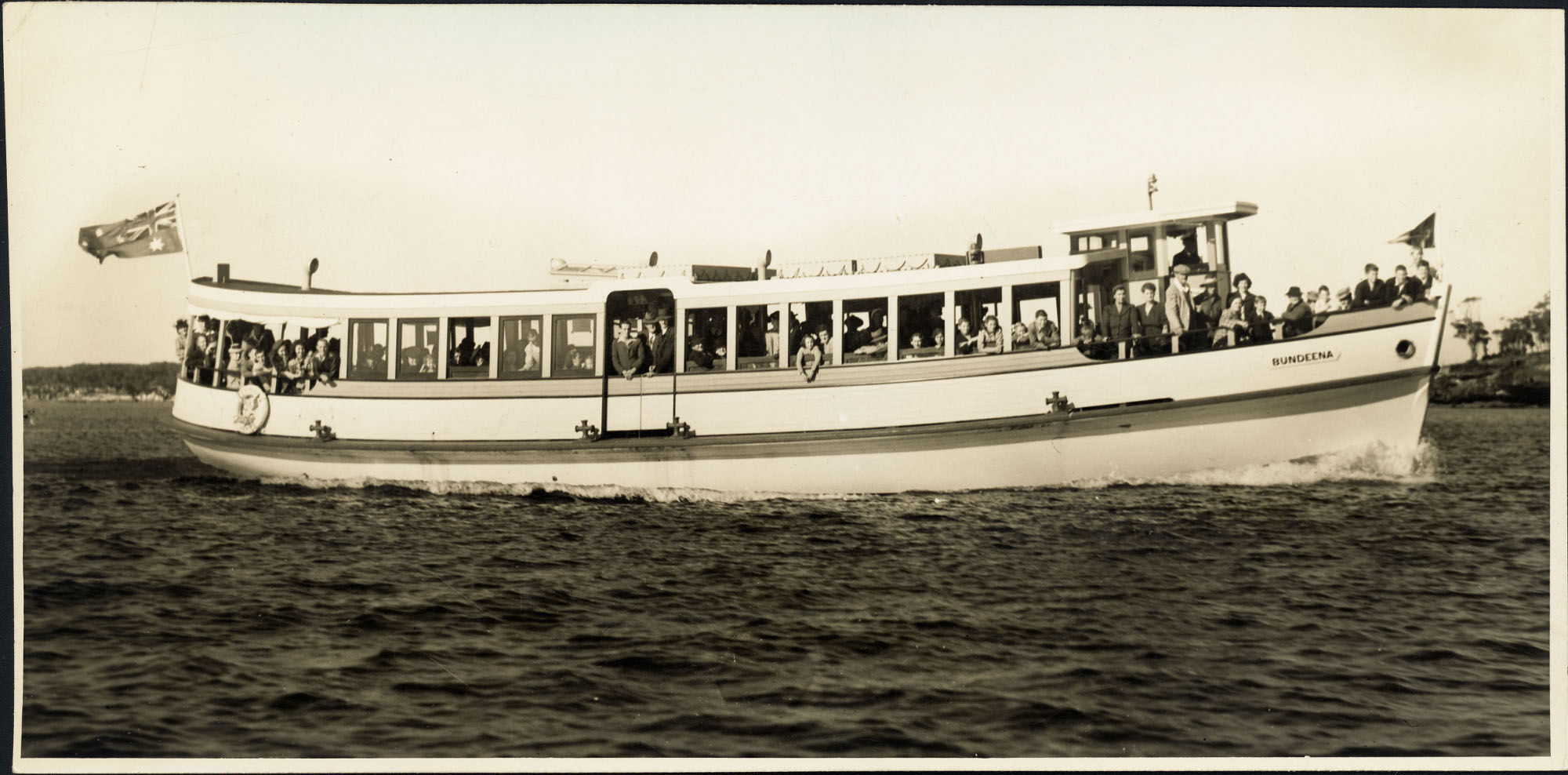
Bundeena Ferry

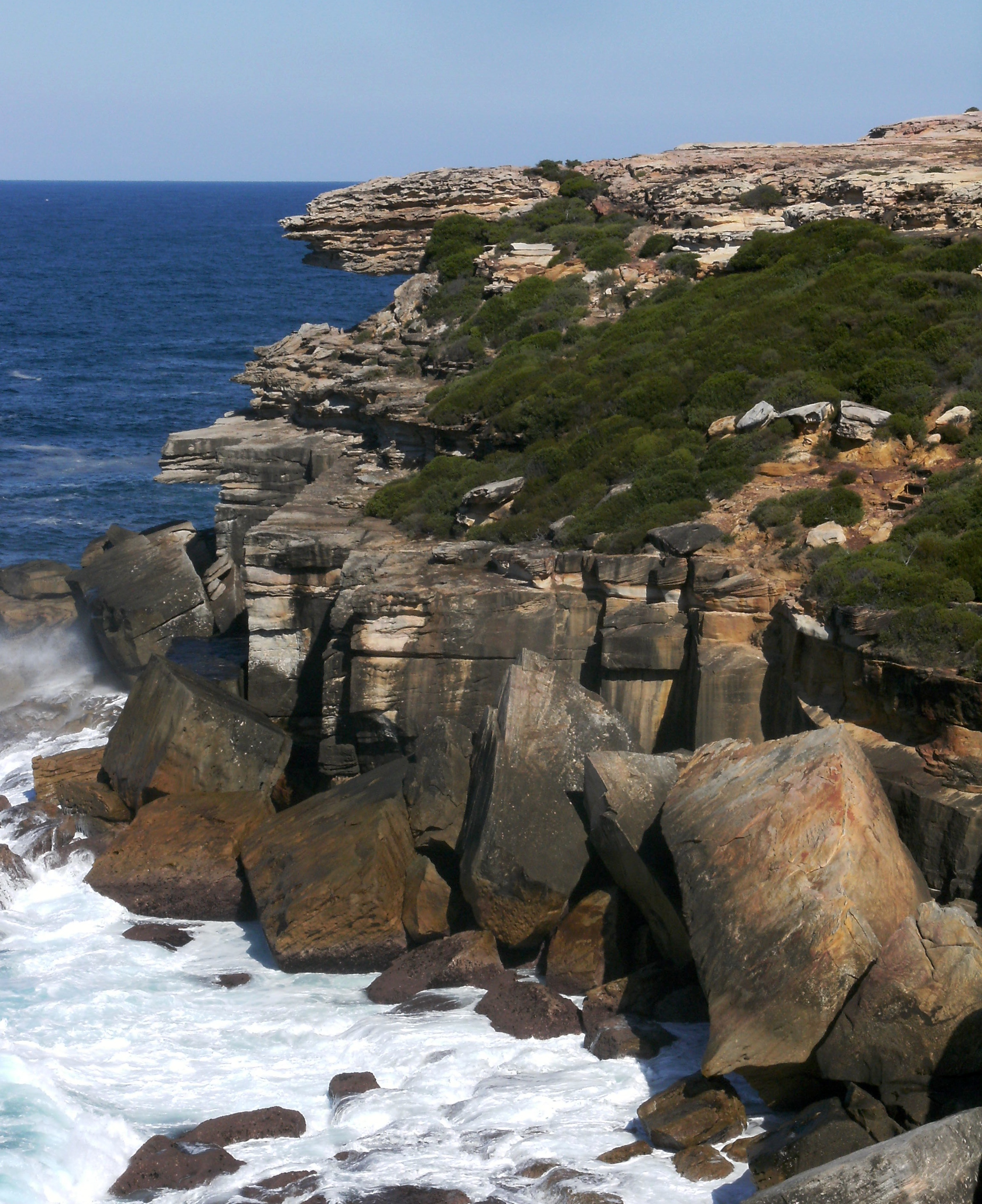
Bundeena to Marley Beach #1

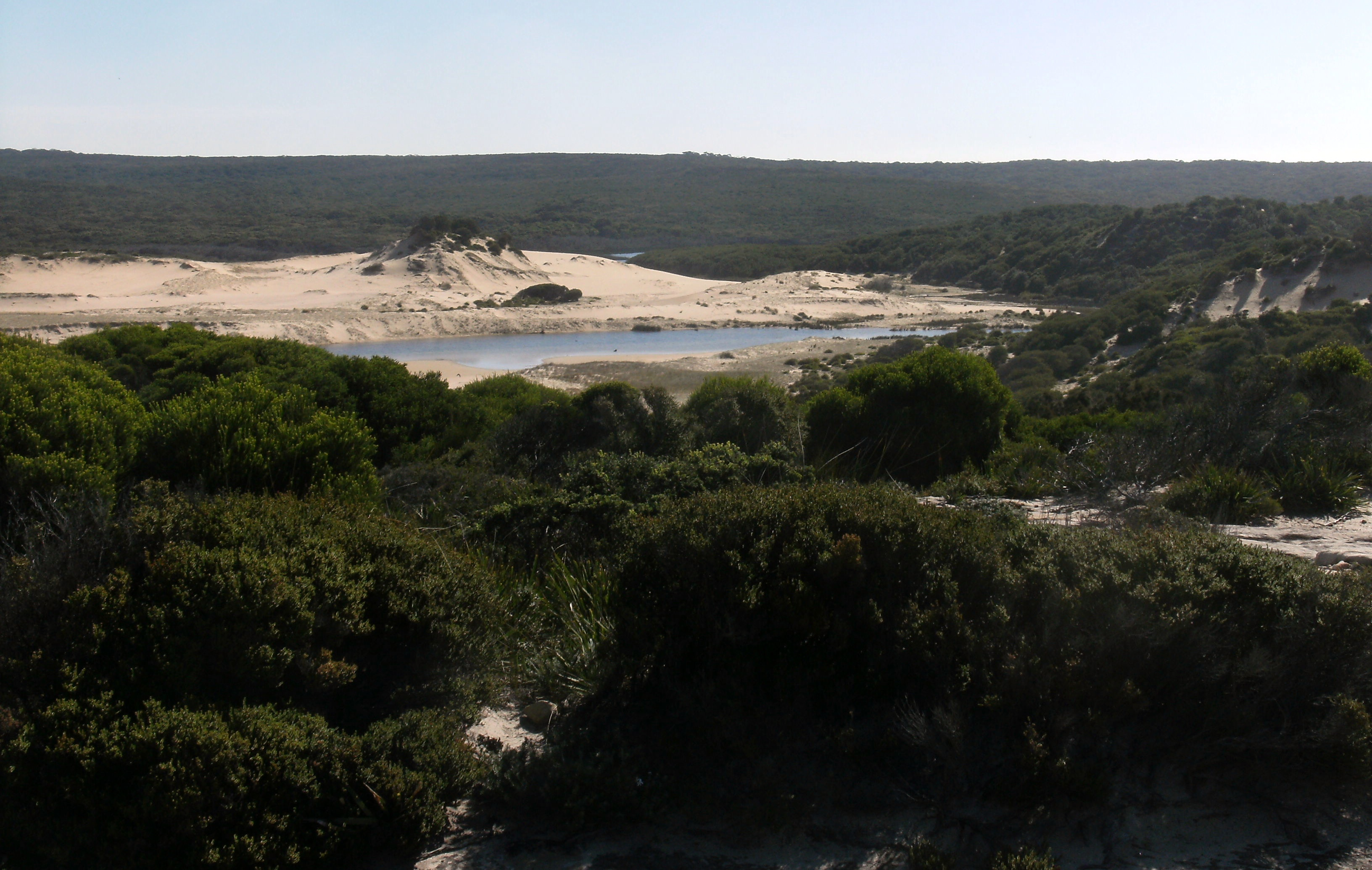
Bundeena to Marley Beach #2

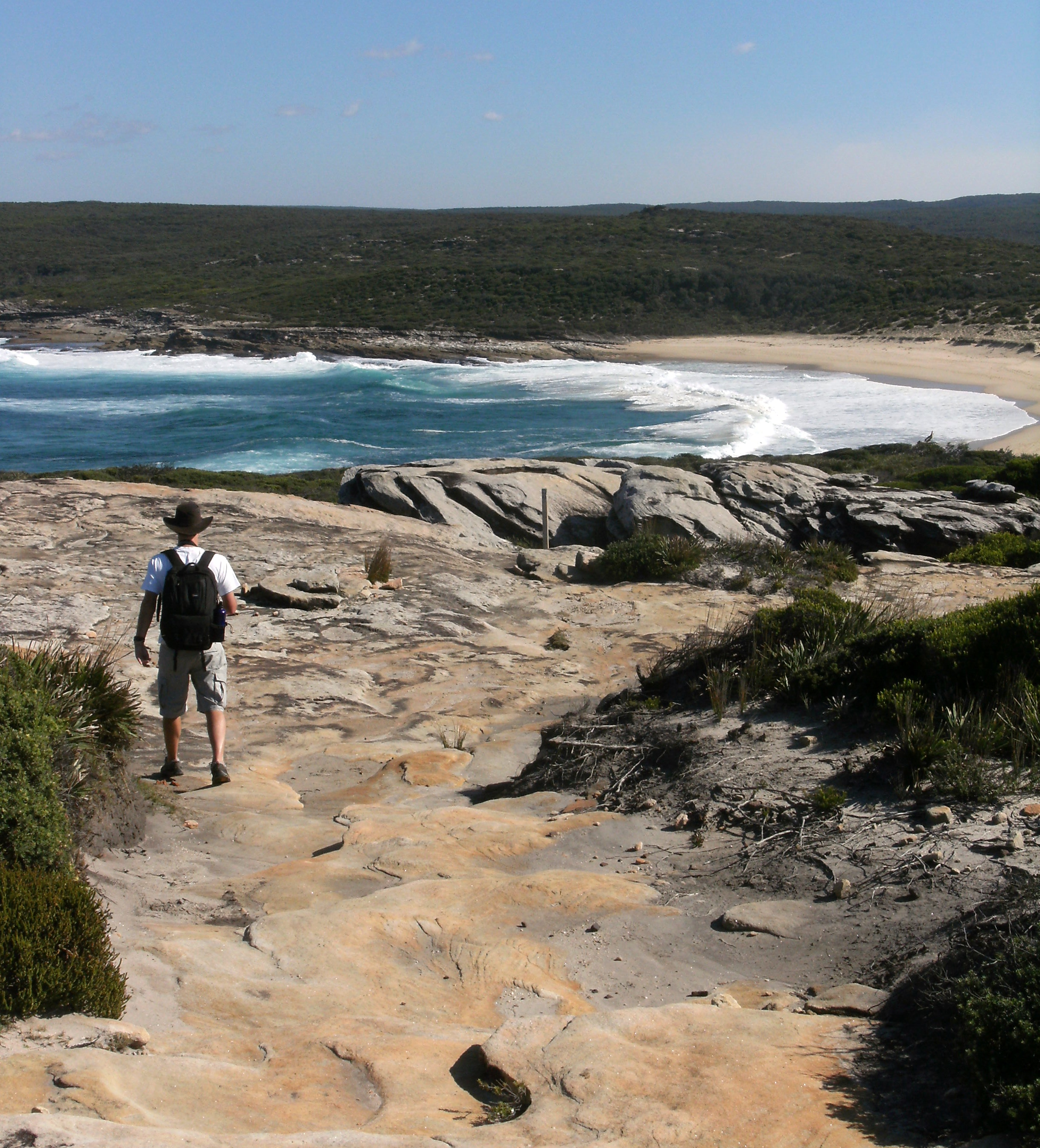
Bundeena to Marley Beach #3

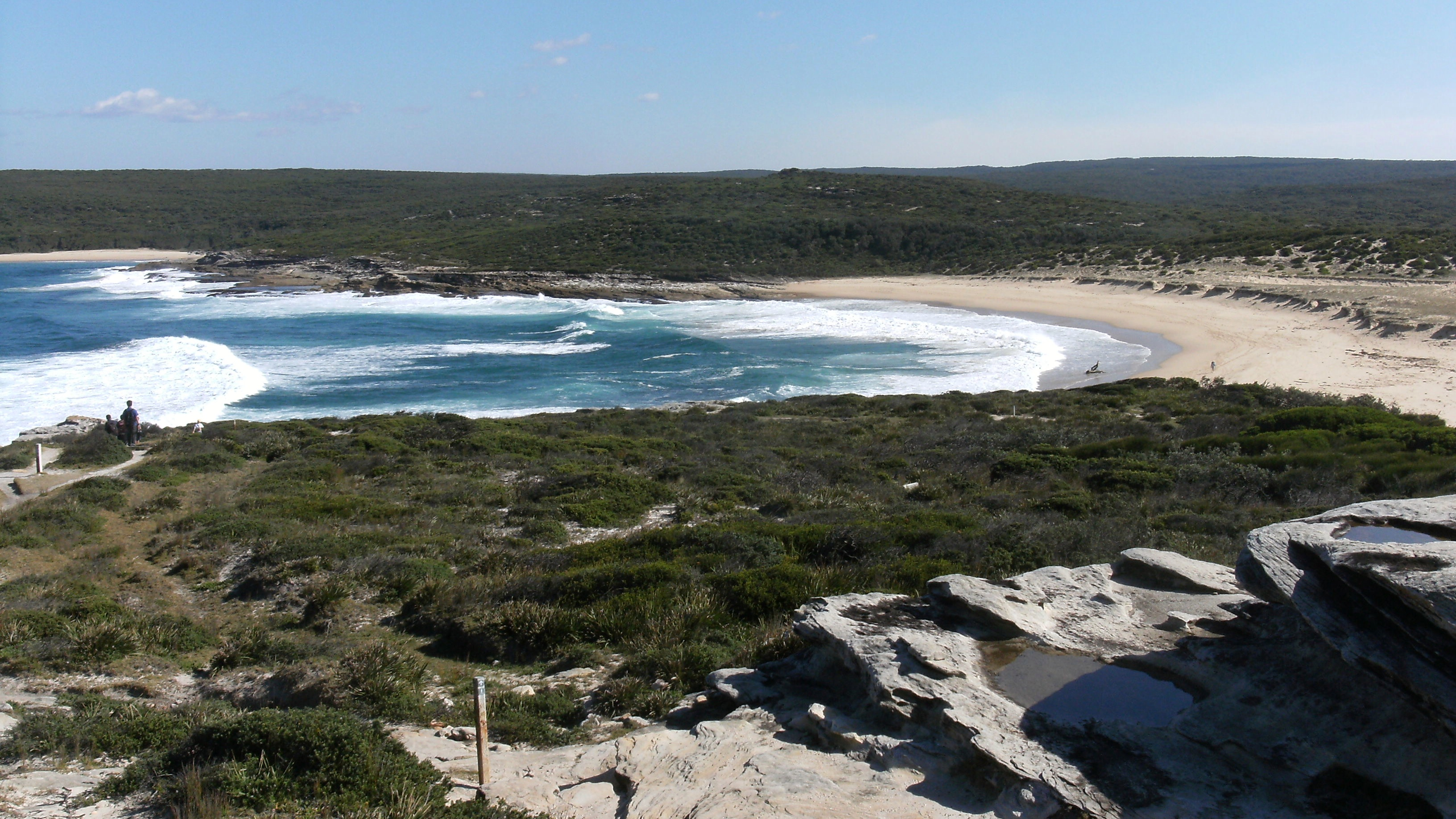
Bundeena to Marley Beach #4

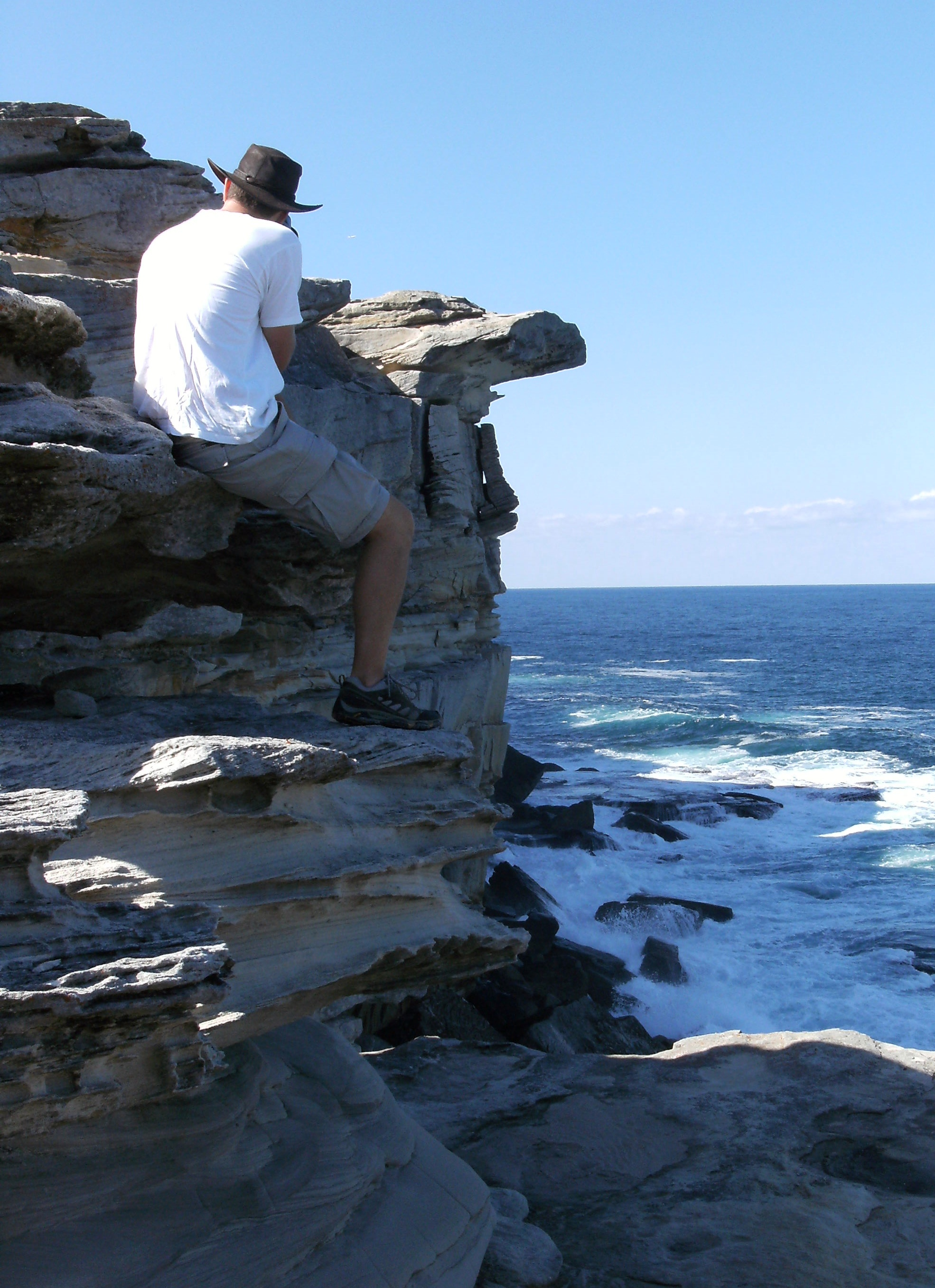
Bundeena to Marley Beach #5

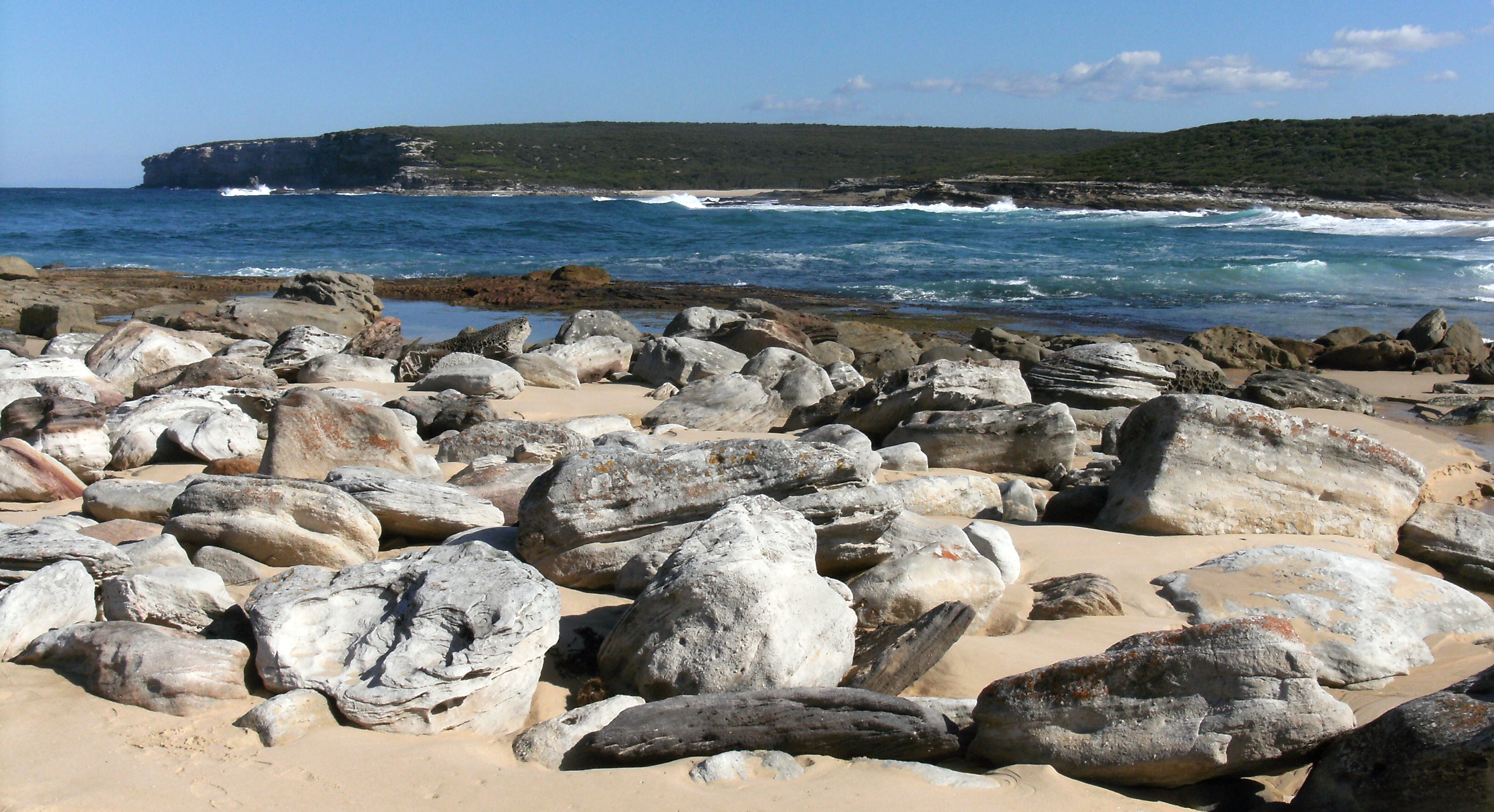
Bundeena to Marley Beach #6

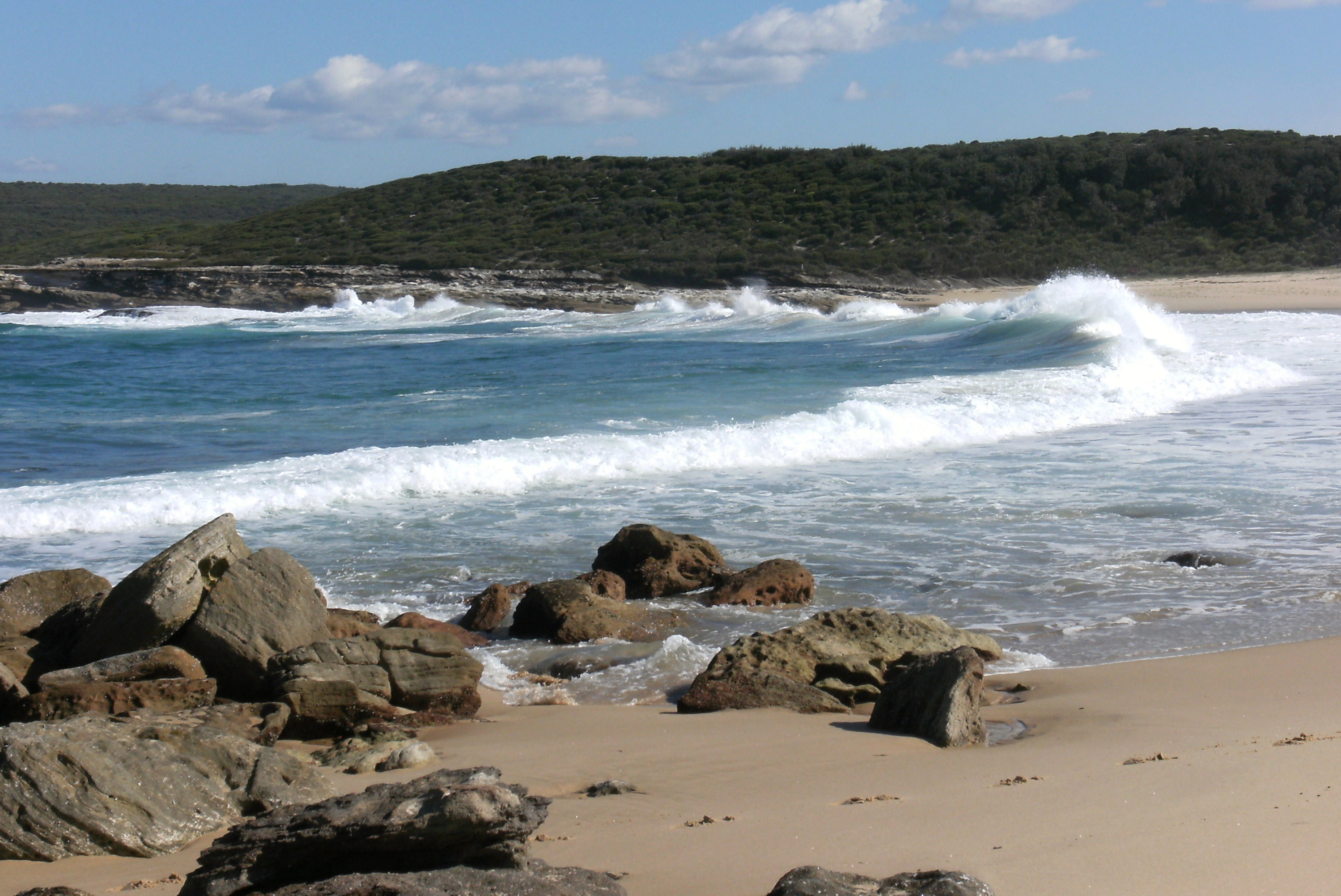
Bundeena to Marley Beach #7

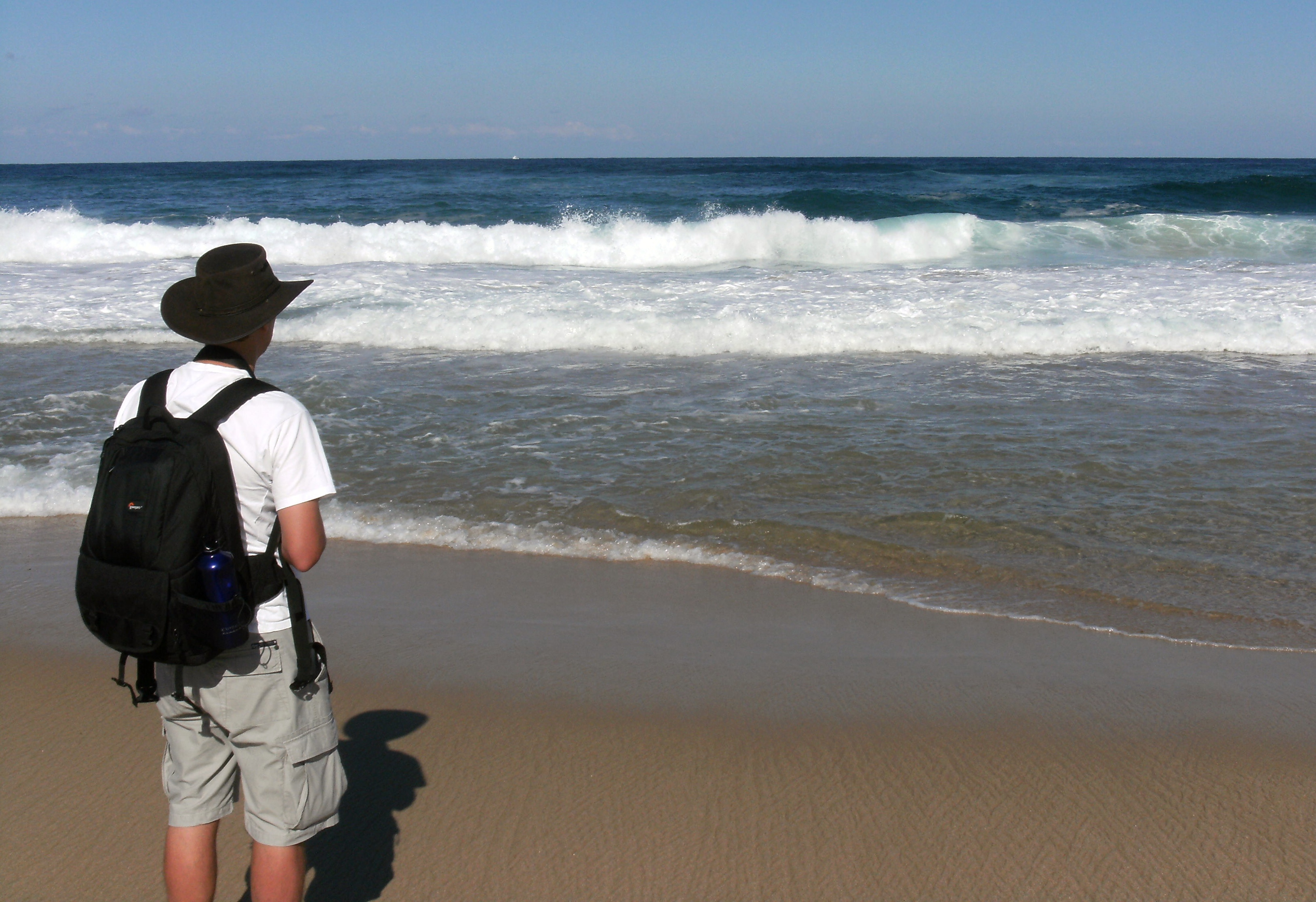
Bundeena to Marley Beach #8

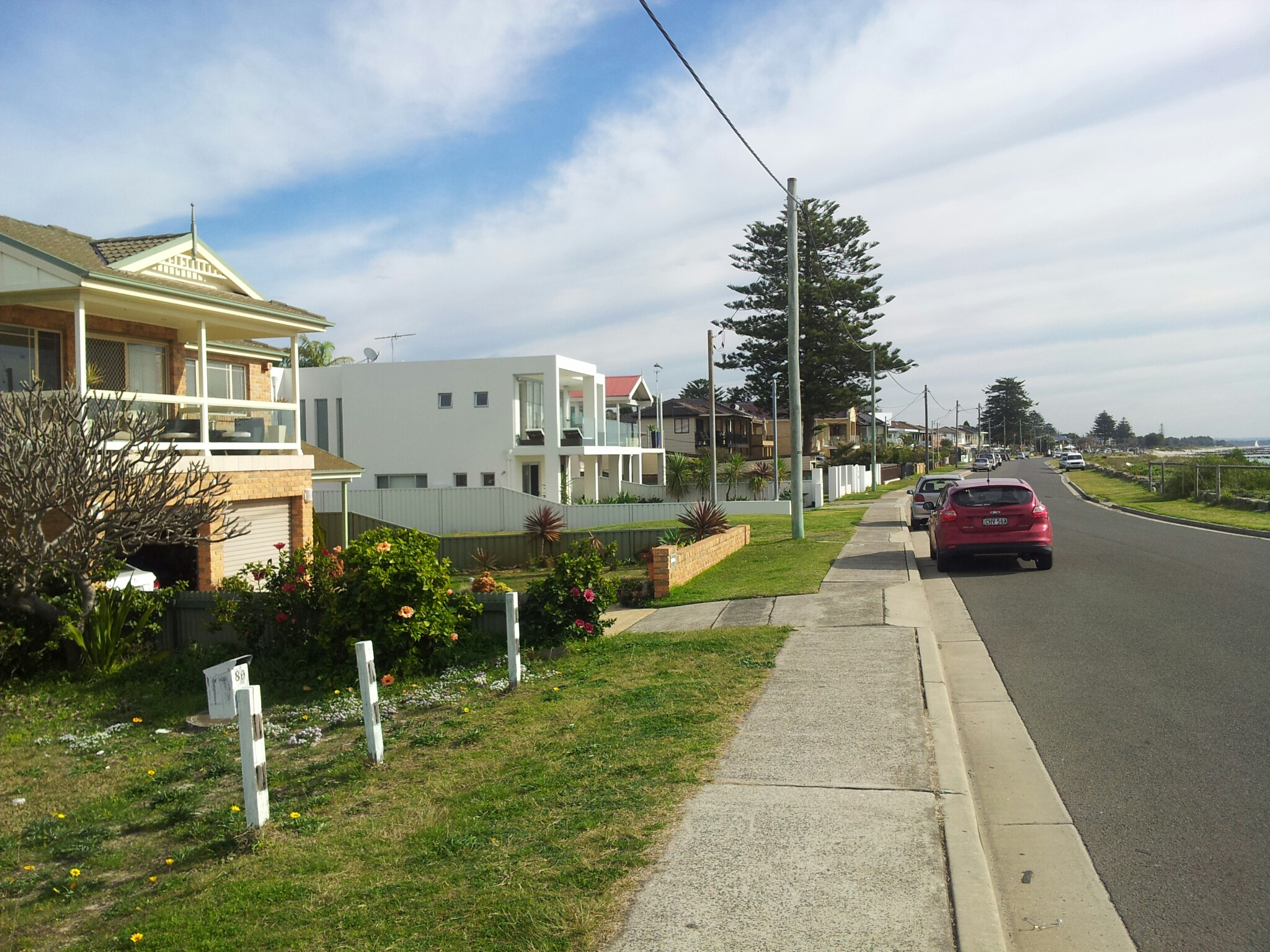
Street in Bundeena

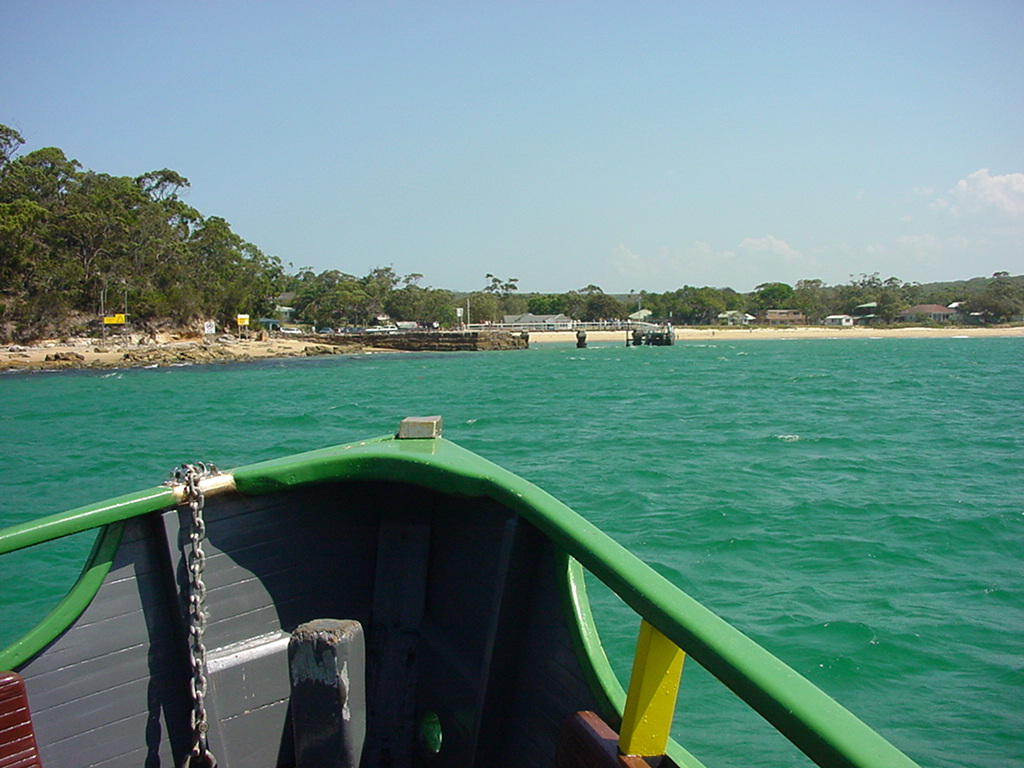
Bundeena NSW 2230, Australia – Panorama #1

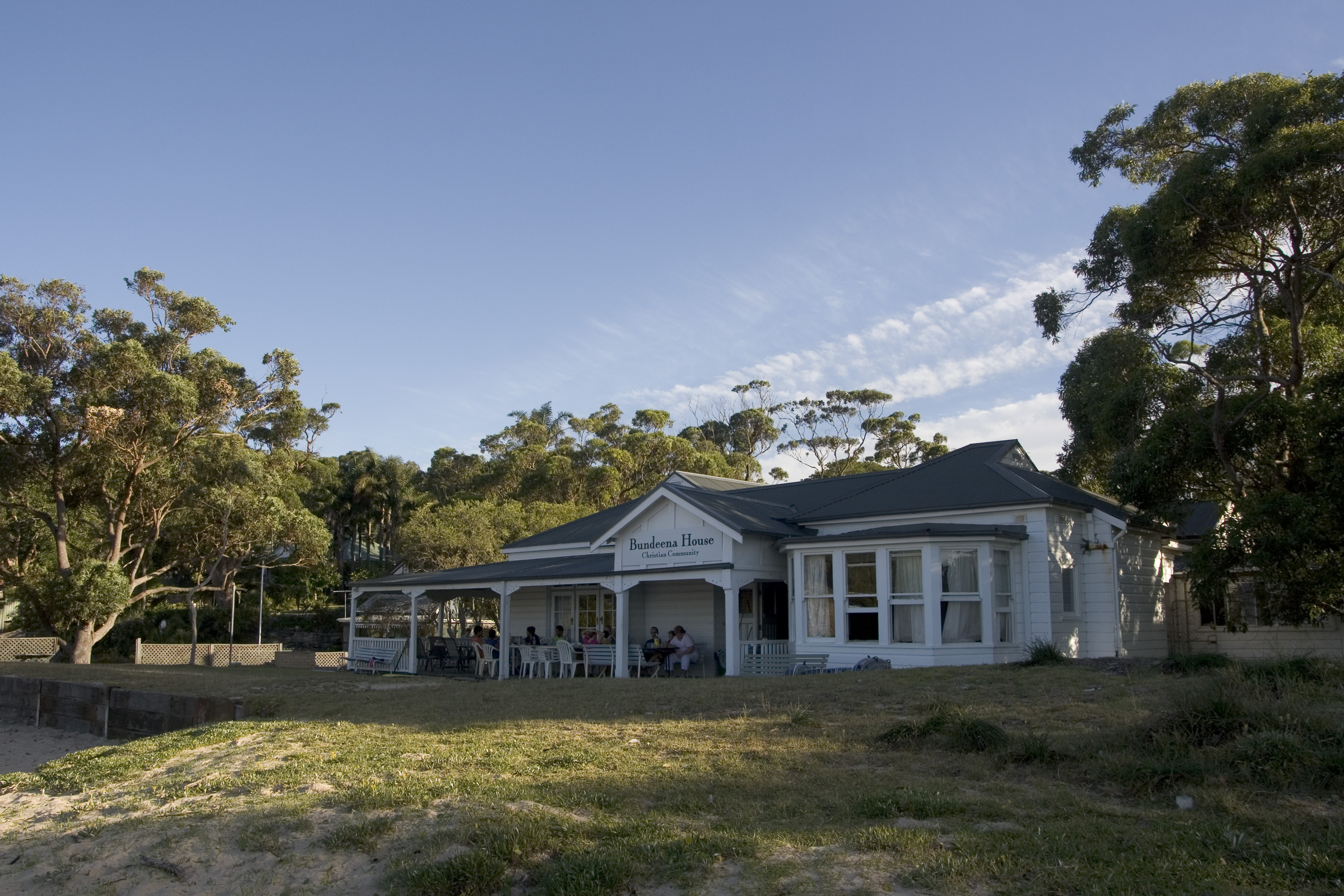
Bundeena House, Bundeena

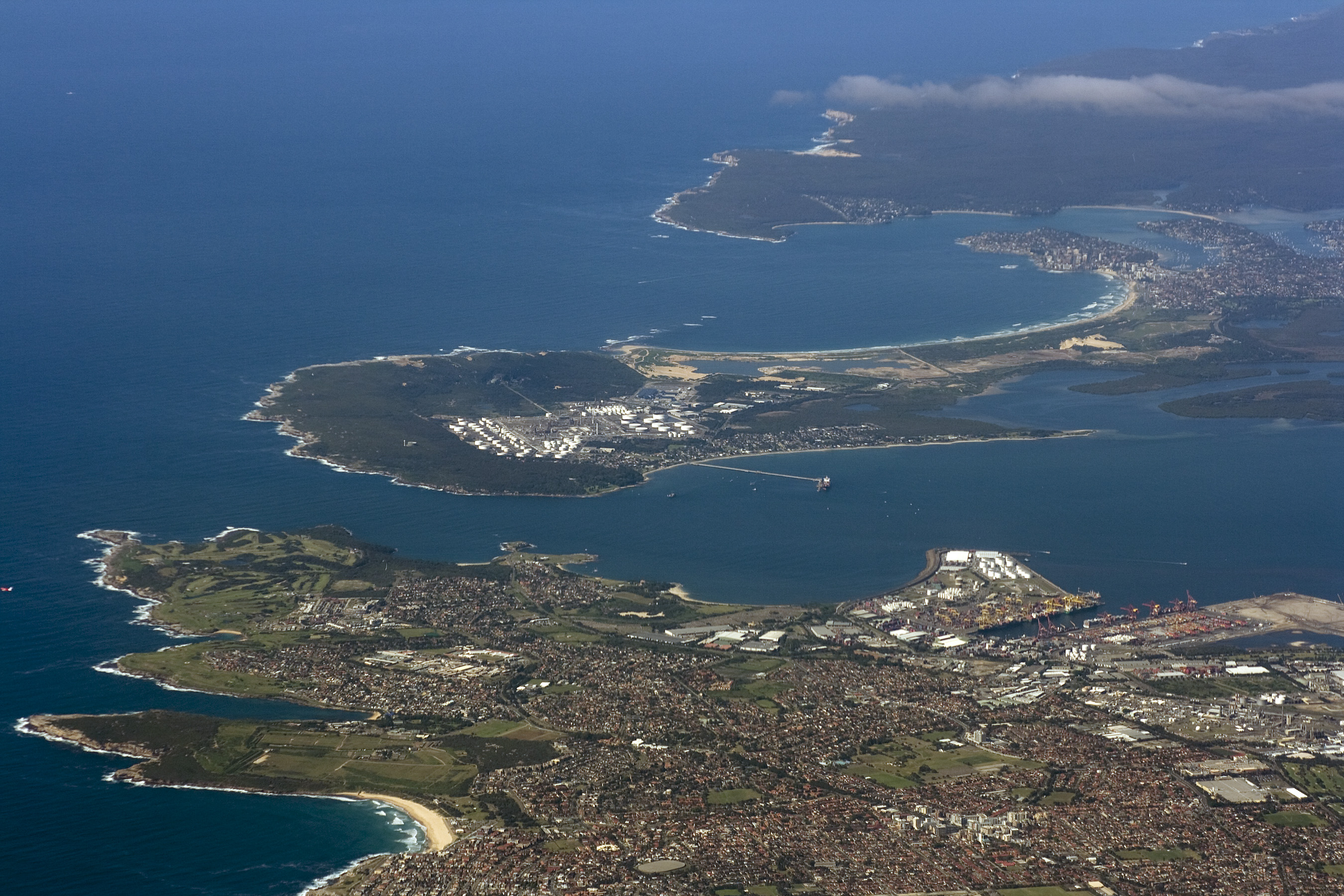
Aerial view of Kurnell, La Perouse, Cronulla and Botany Bay

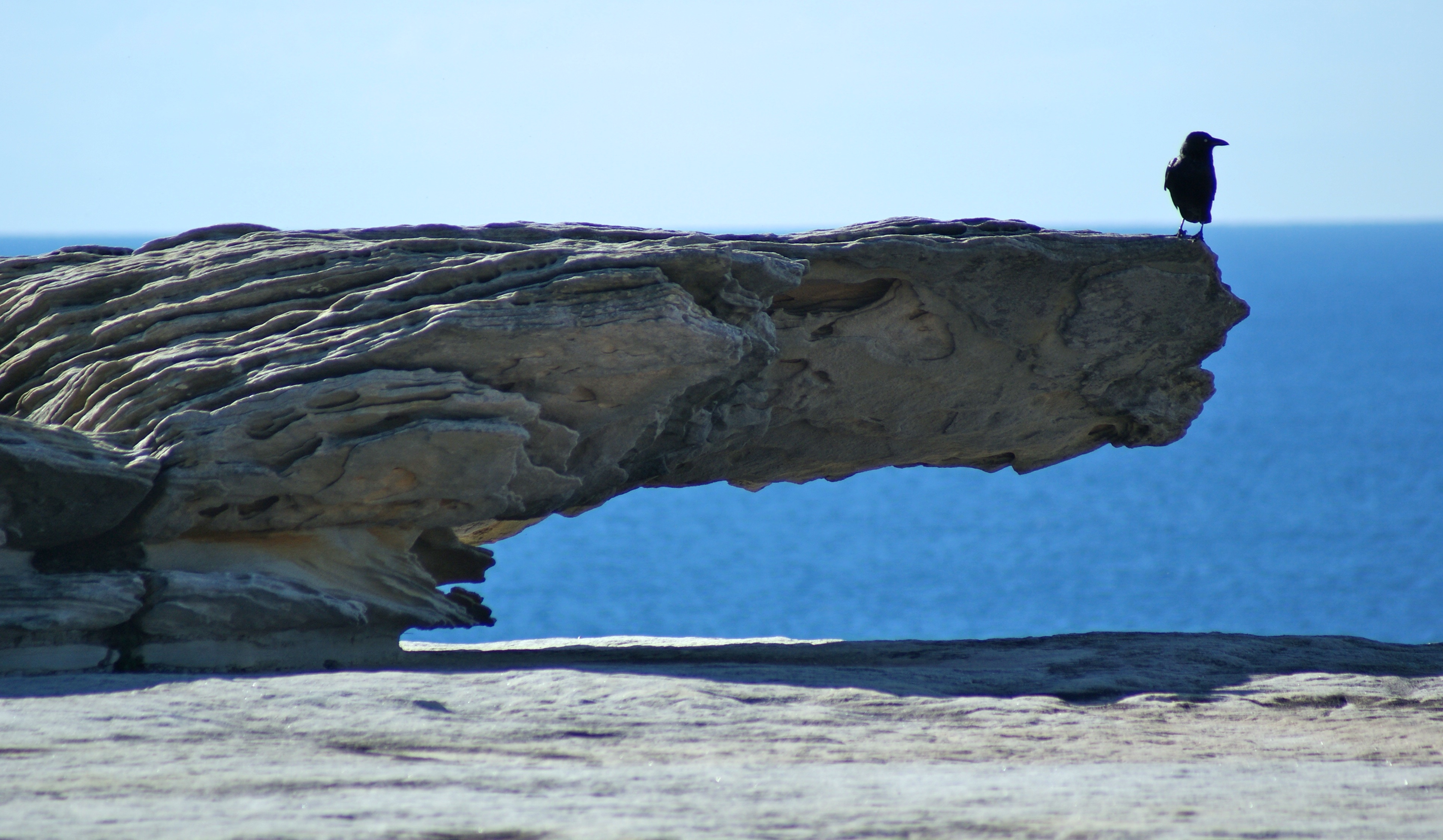
The sandstone rocks on the cliffs by the ocean and between "The Cobblers" and Port Hacking Point

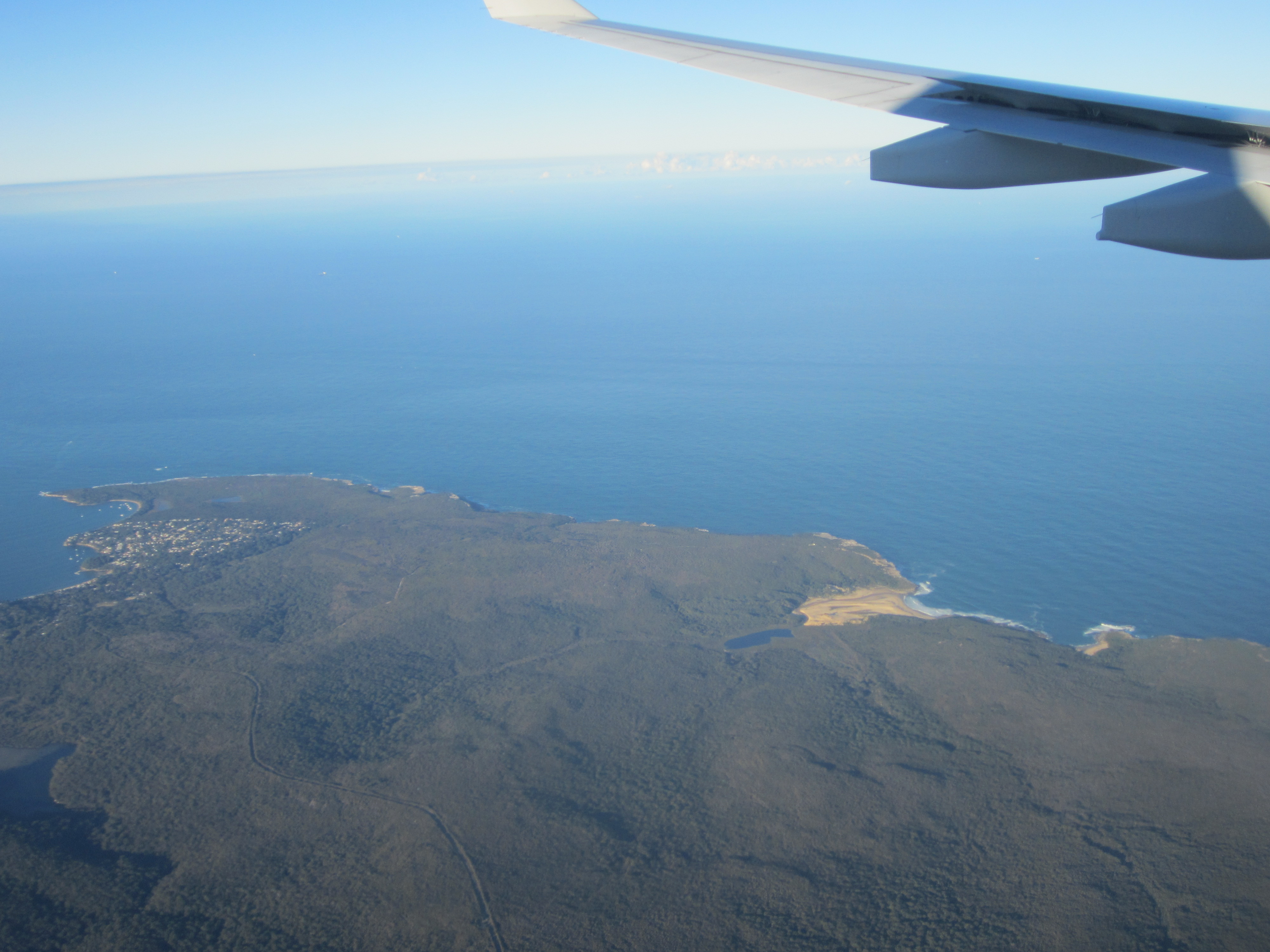
Aerial view of Marley Beach in the Royal National Park and Bundeena

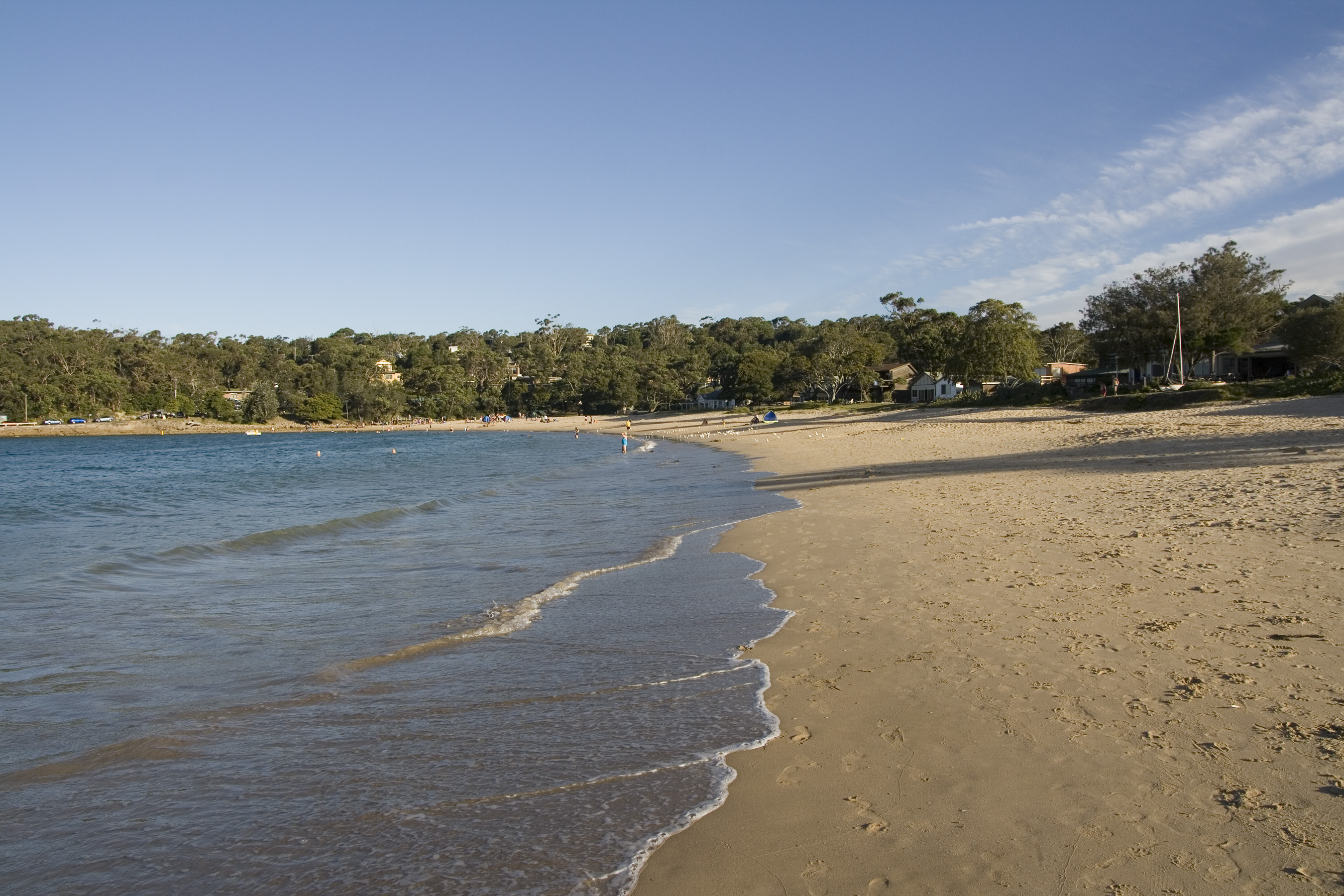
A beach in Bundeena – Panorama

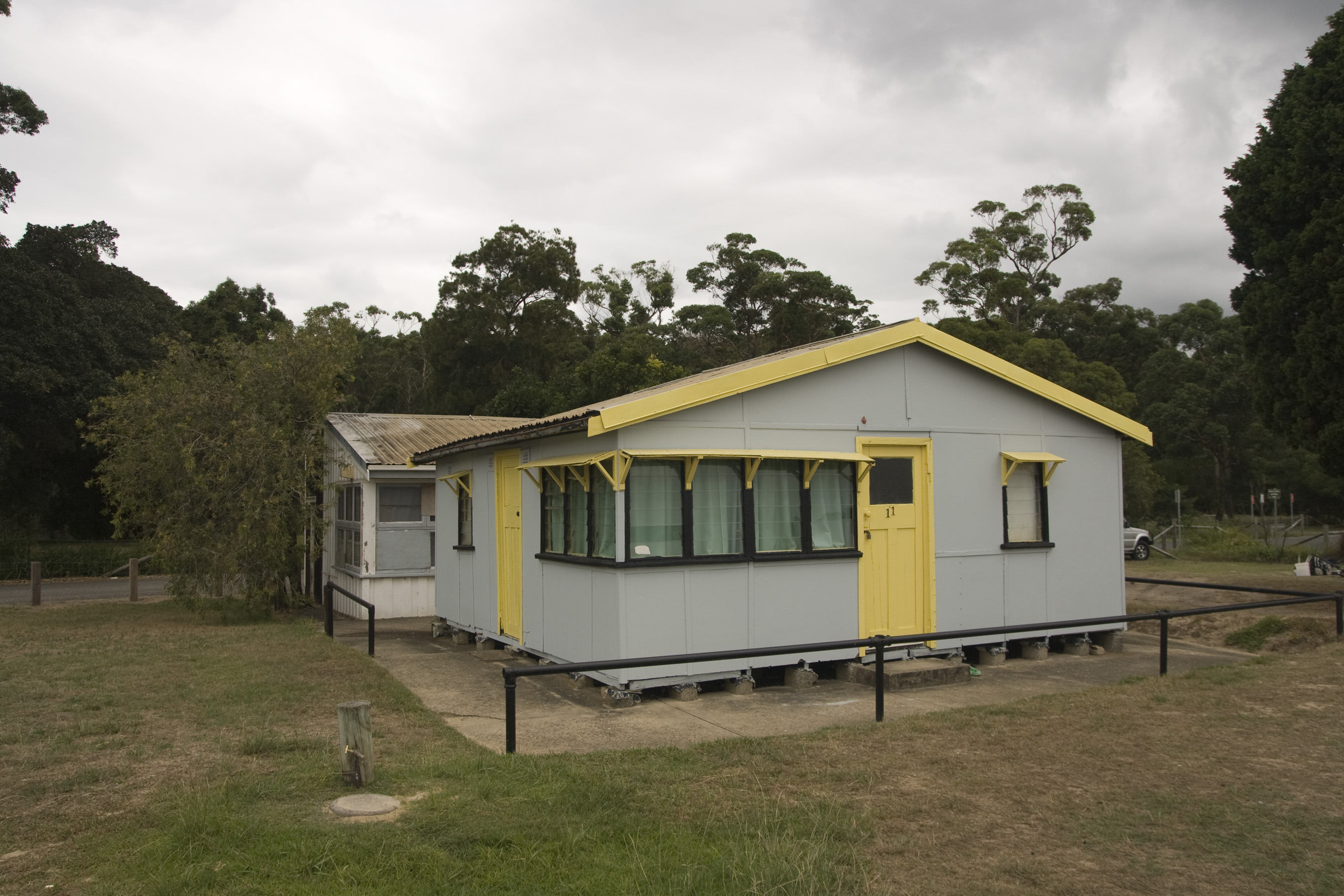
Bundeena NSW 2230, Australia – Panorama #2

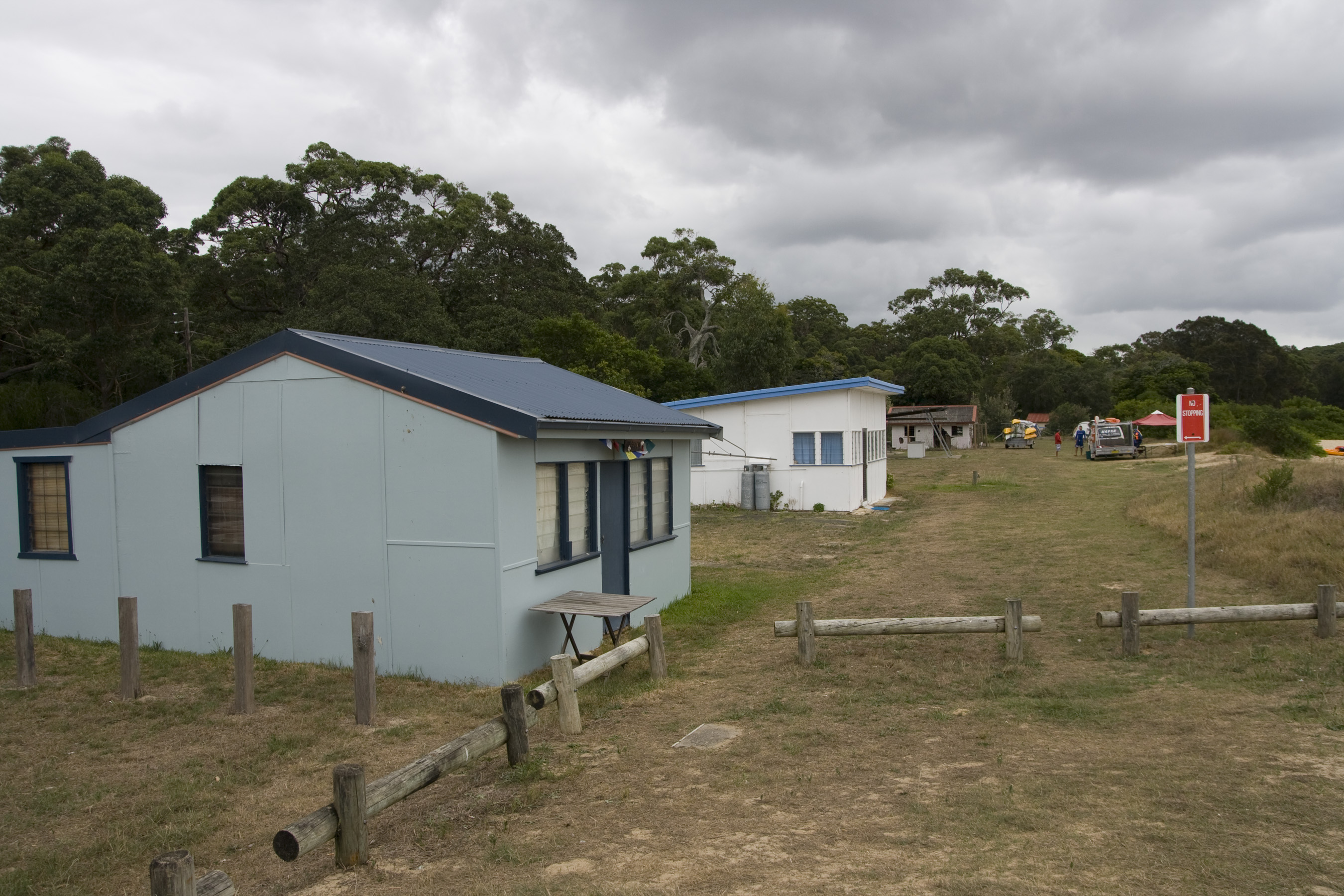
Bundeena NSW 2230, Australia – Panorama #3

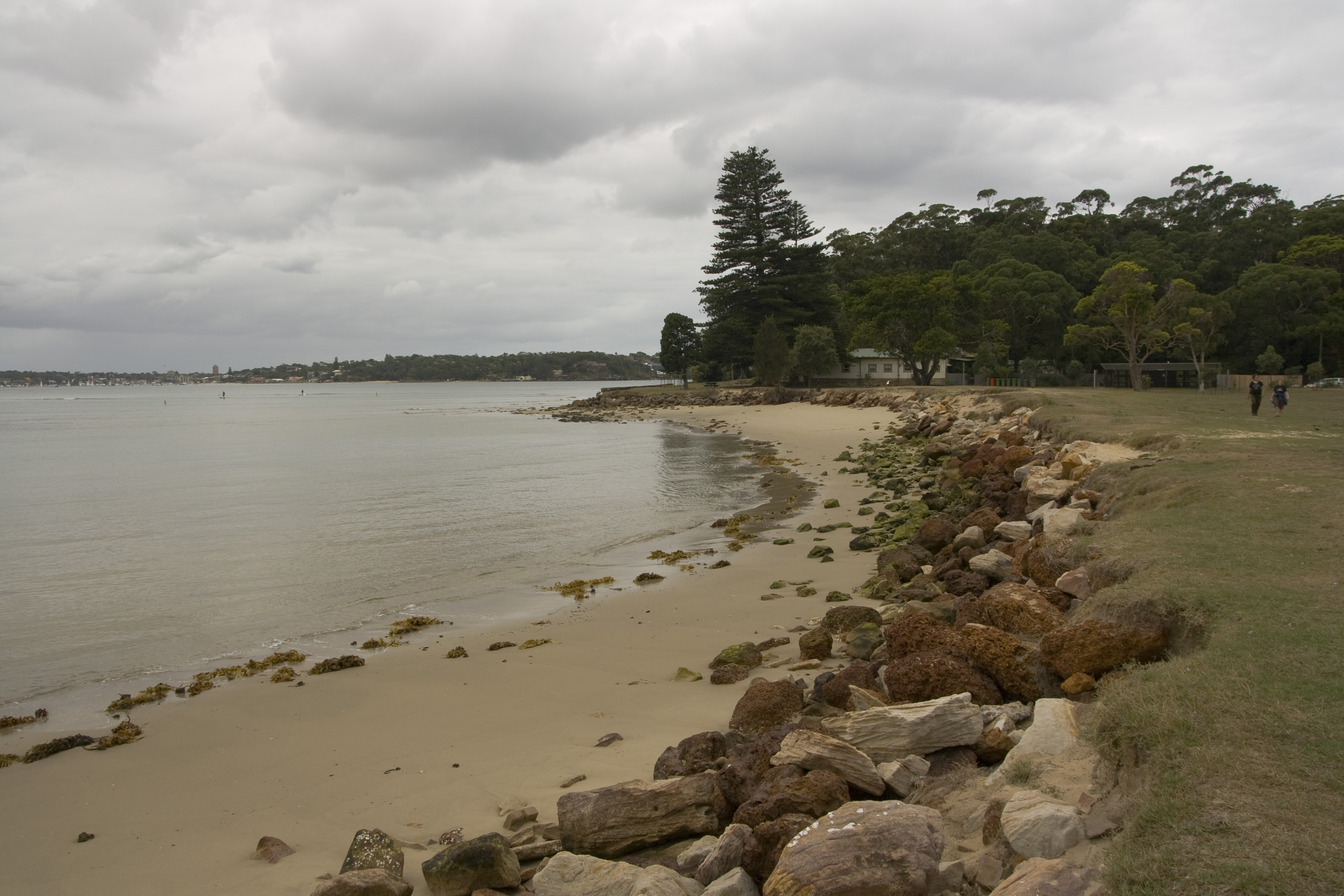
Bundeena NSW 2230, Australia – Panorama #4

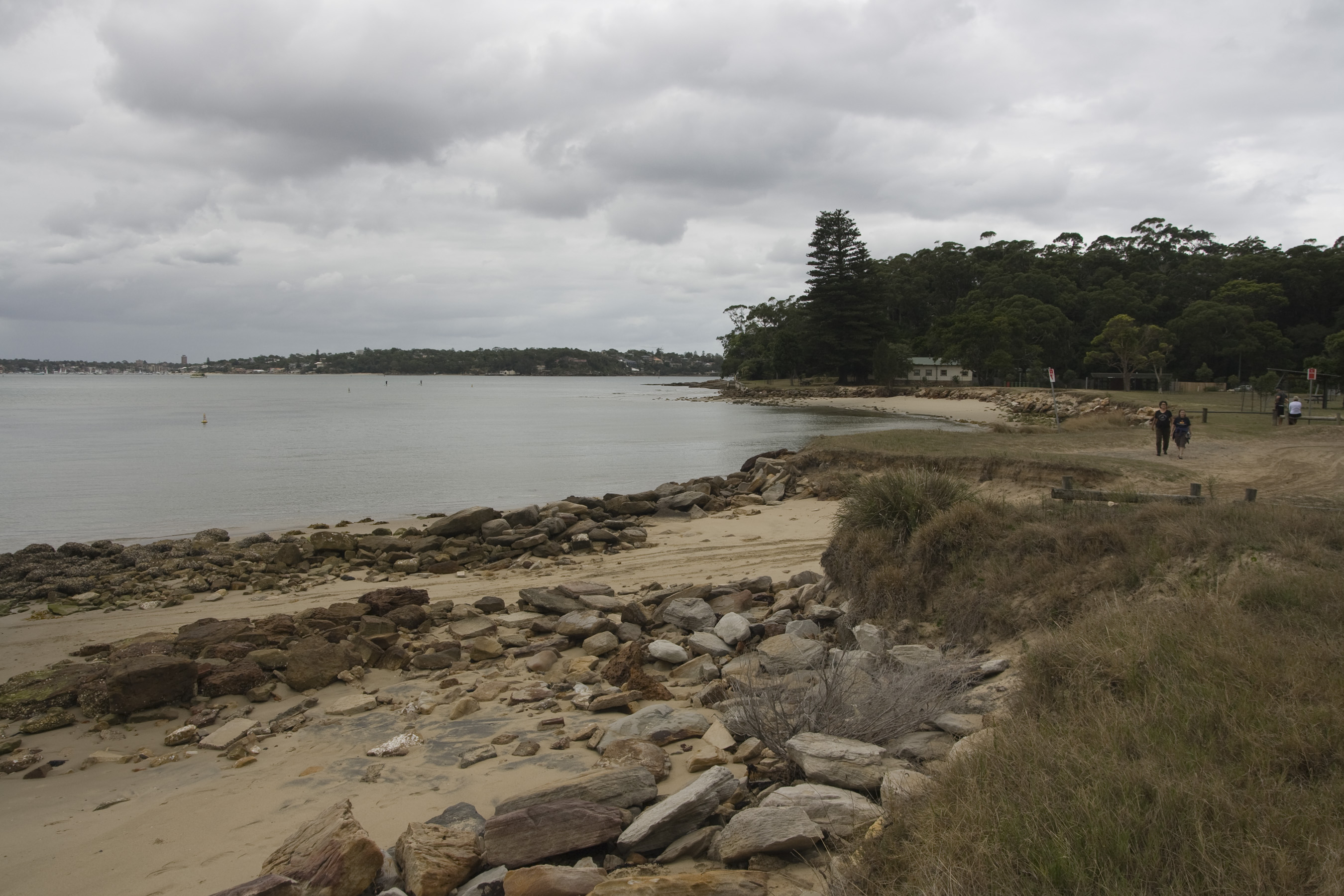
Bundeena NSW 2230, Australia – Panorama #5

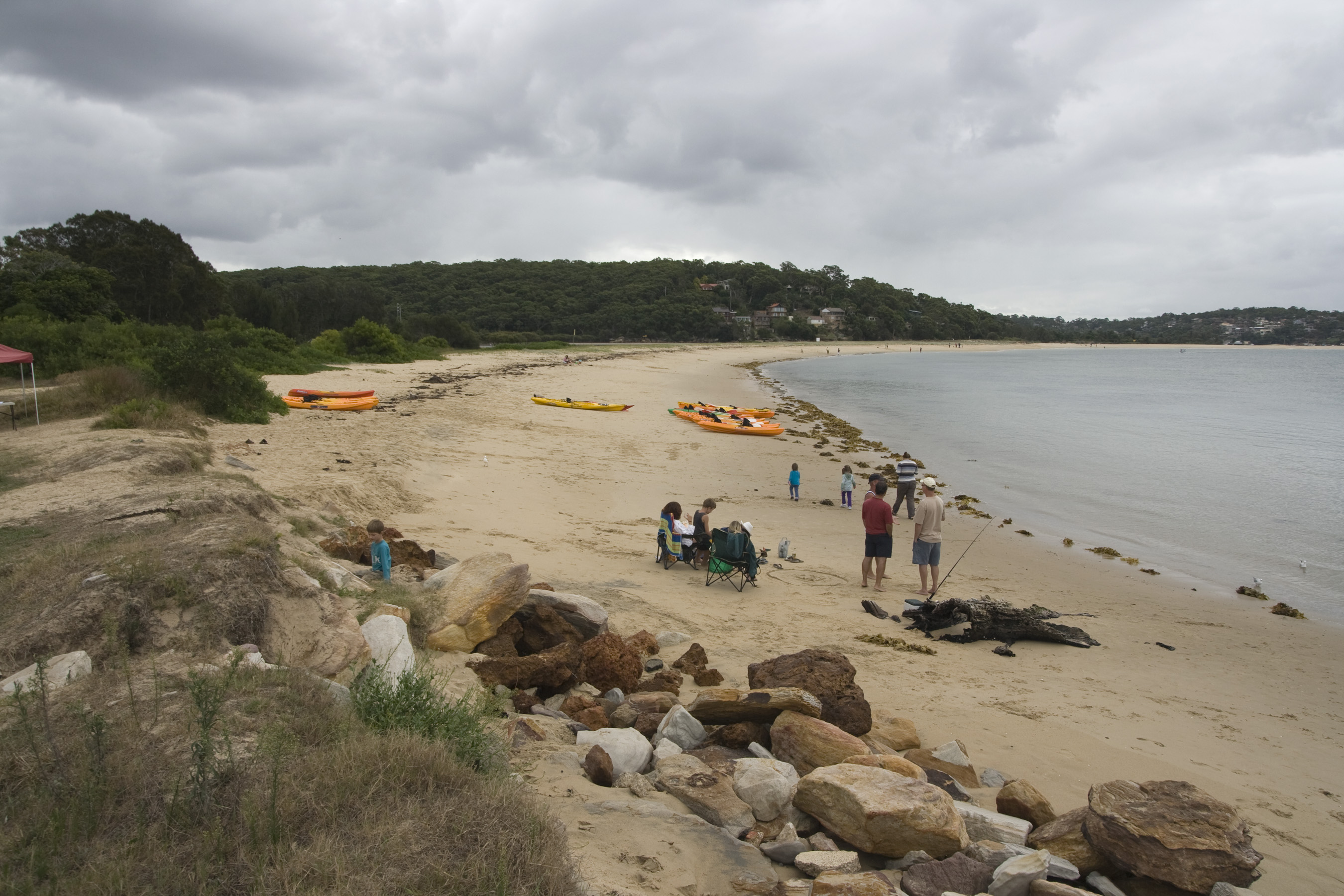
Bundeena NSW 2230, Australia – Panorama #6

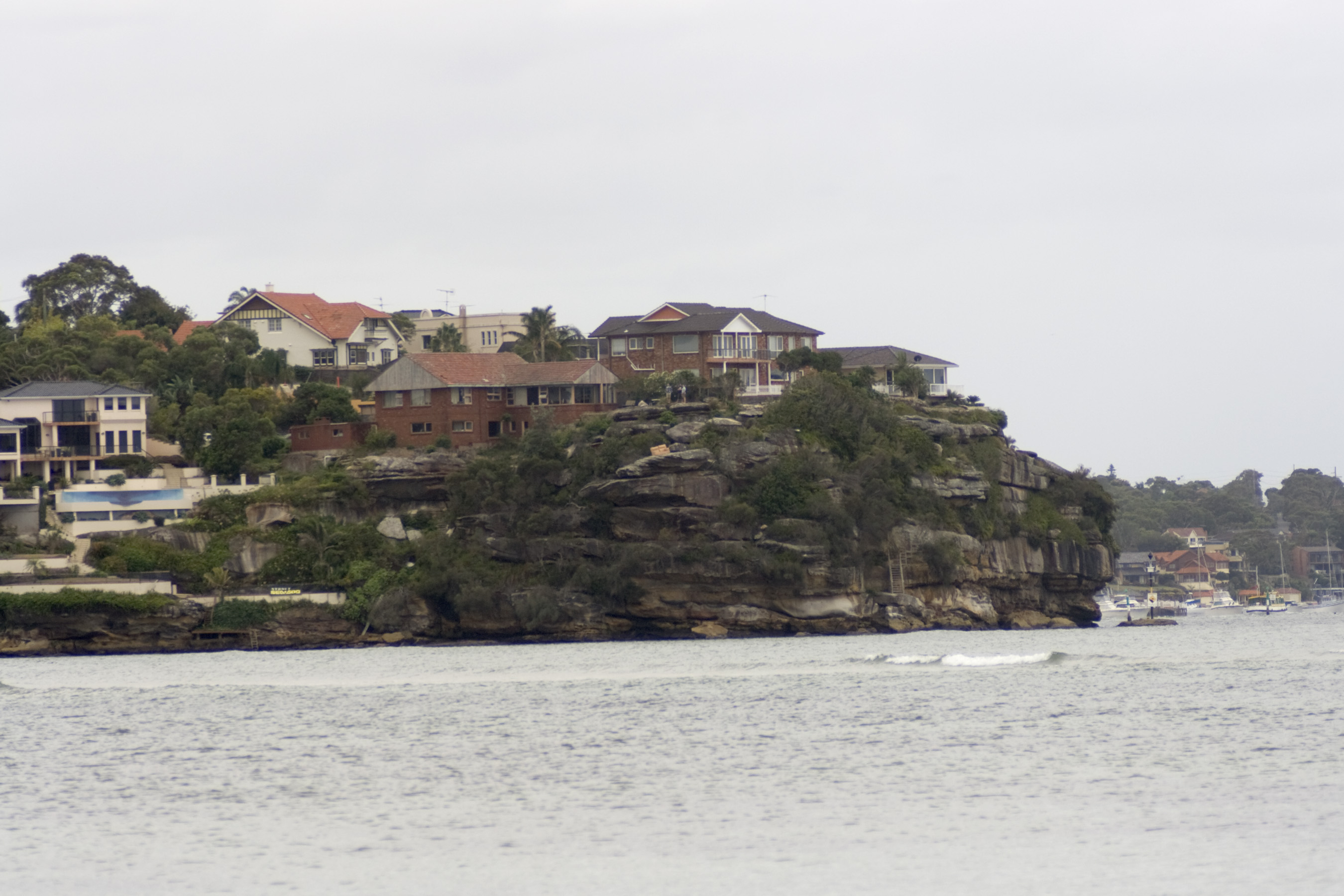
Bundeena NSW 2230, Australia – Panorama #7

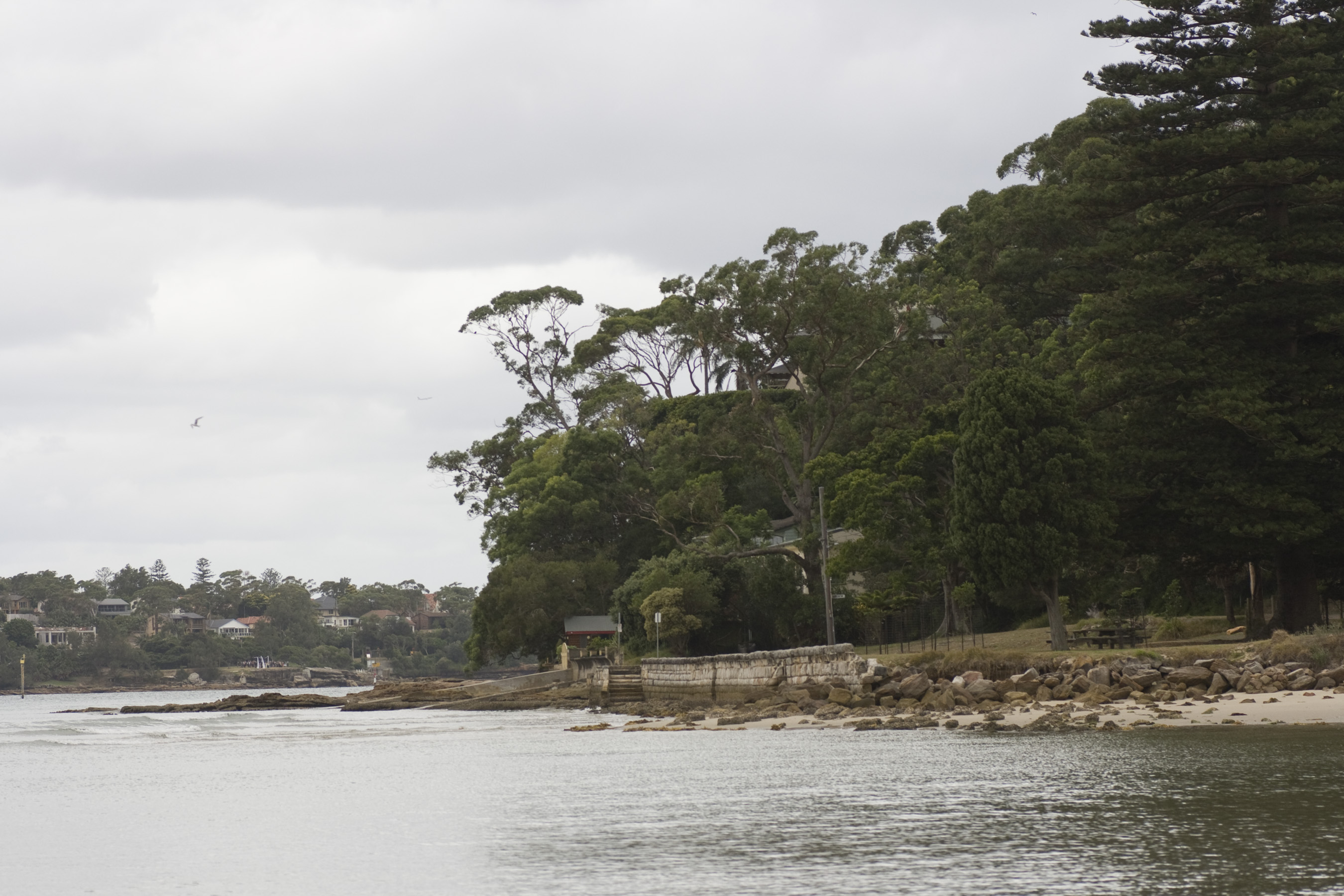
Bundeena NSW 2230, Australia – Panorama #8

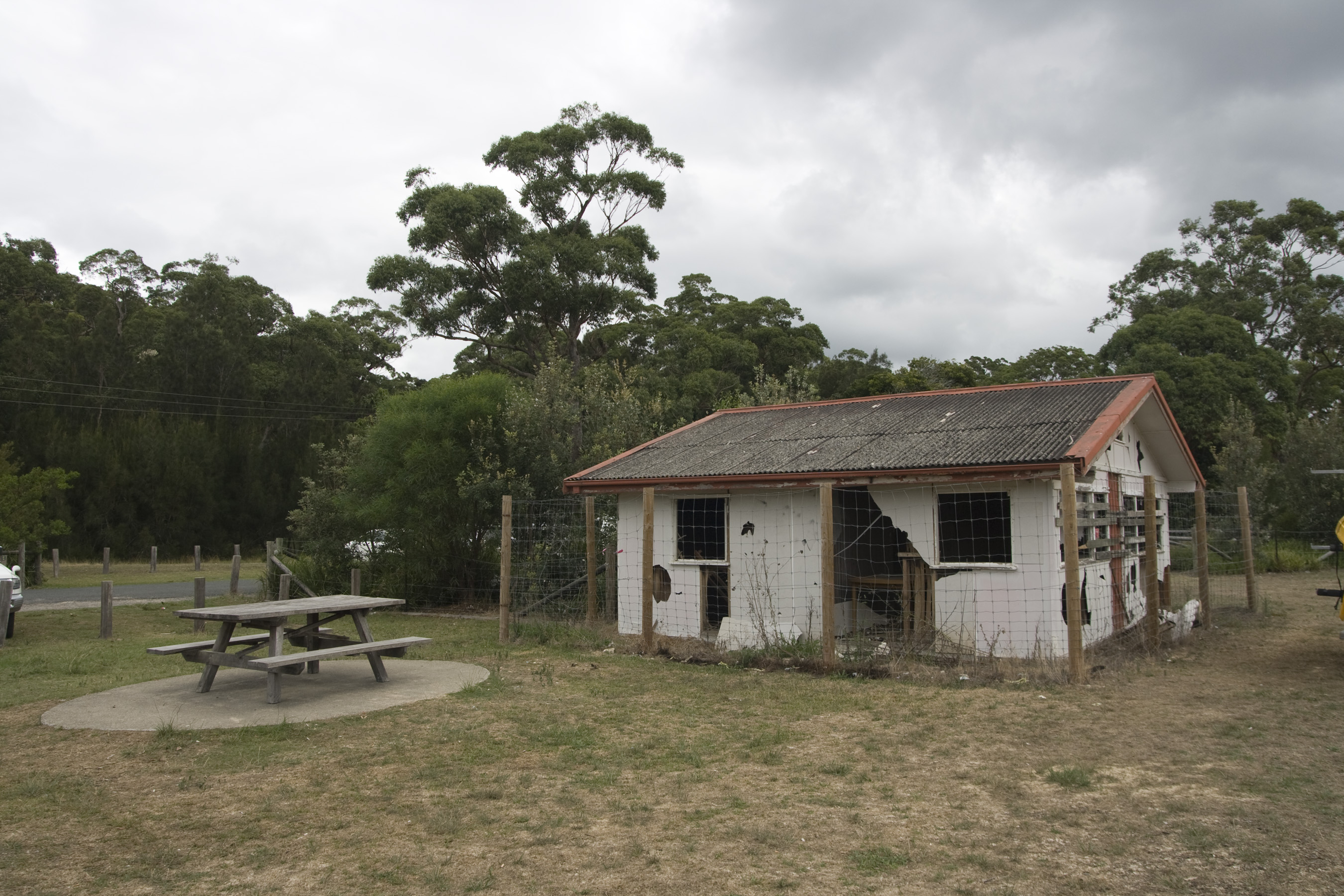
Bonnie Vale Access Road

Bundeena NSW 2230, Australia – Panorama #9

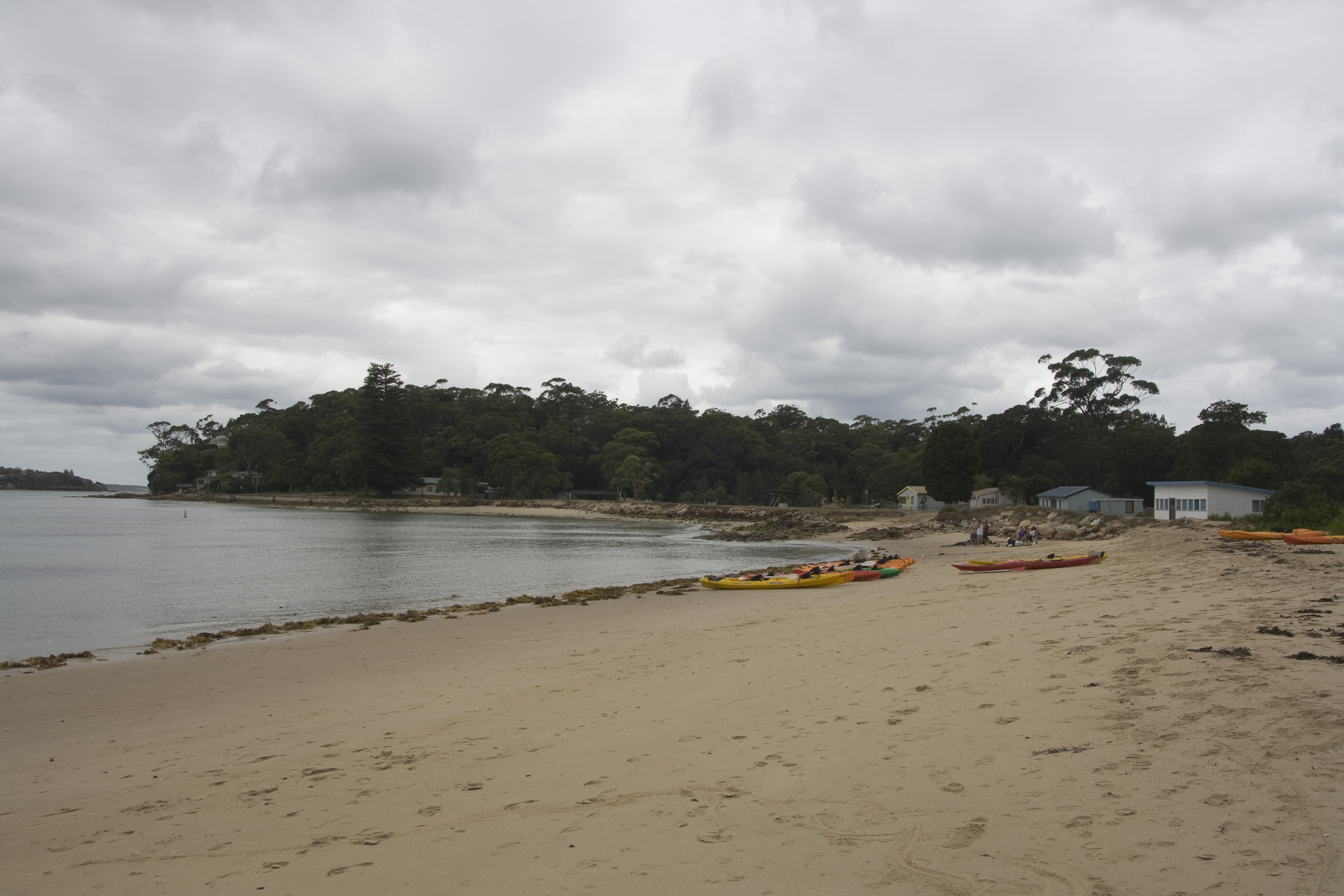
Bundeena NSW 2230, Australia – Panorama #10

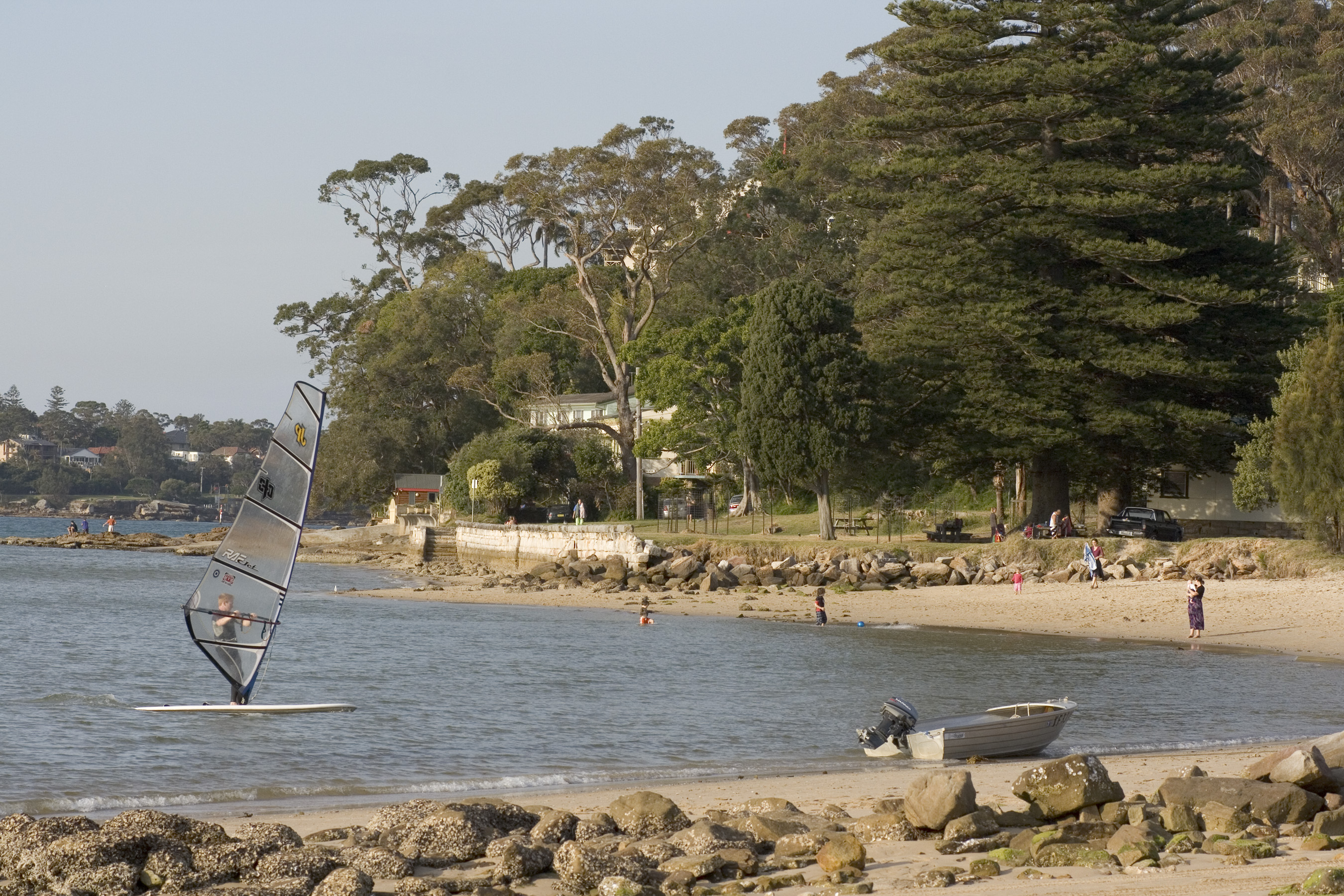
Bundeena NSW 2230, Australia – Panorama #11

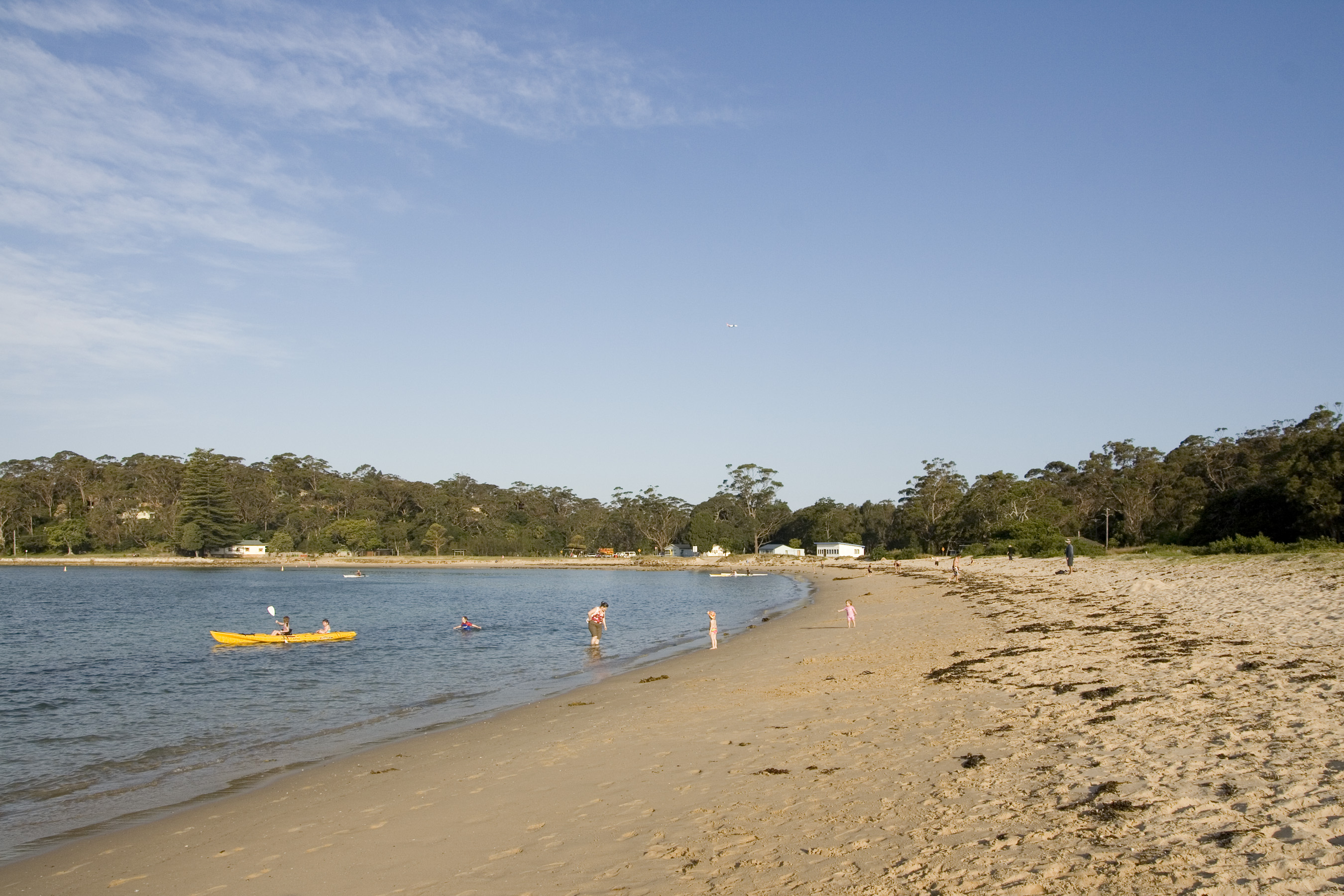
Bundeena NSW 2230, Australia – Panorama #12

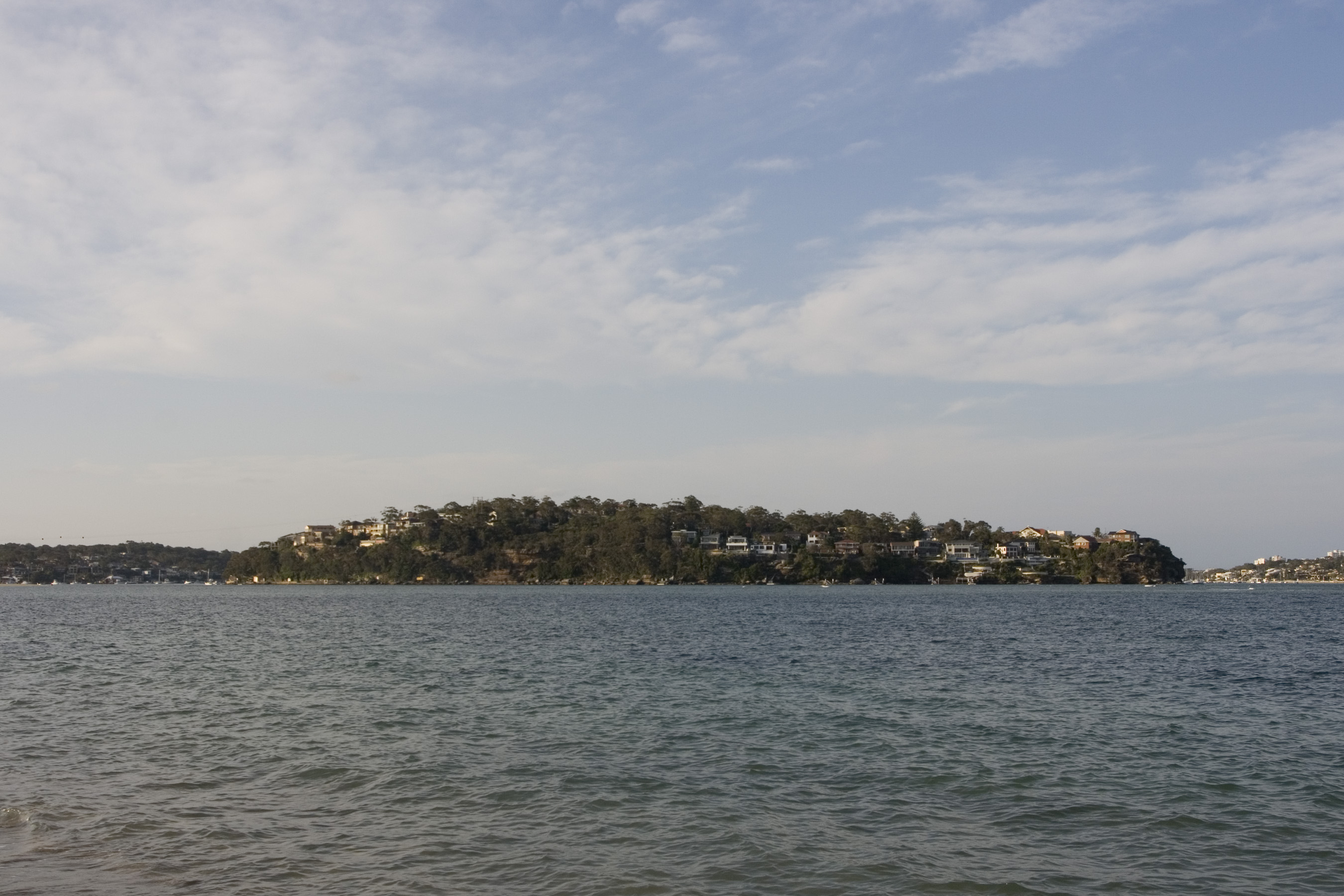
Bundeena NSW 2230, Australia – Panorama #13

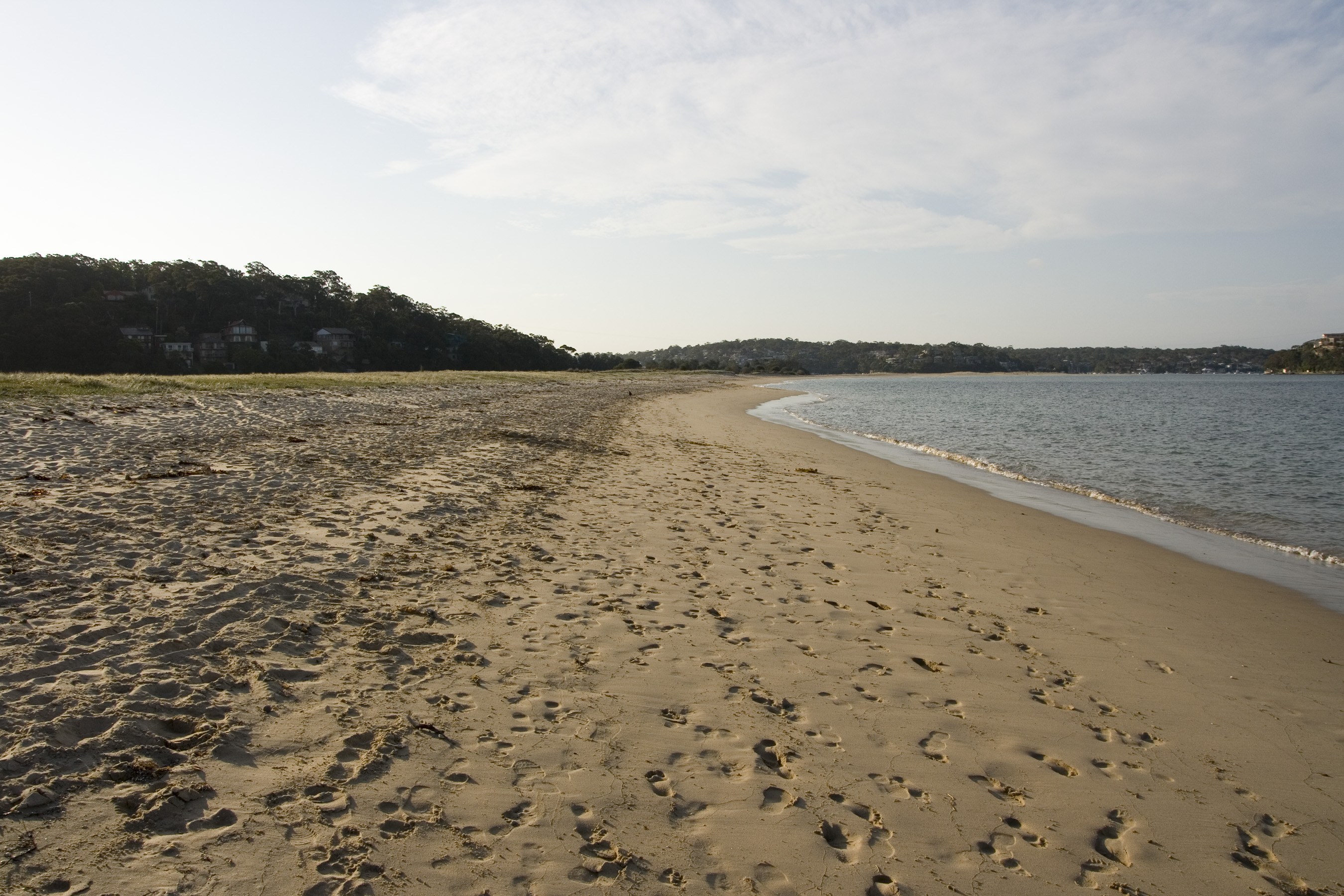
Bundeena NSW 2230, Australia – Panorama #14

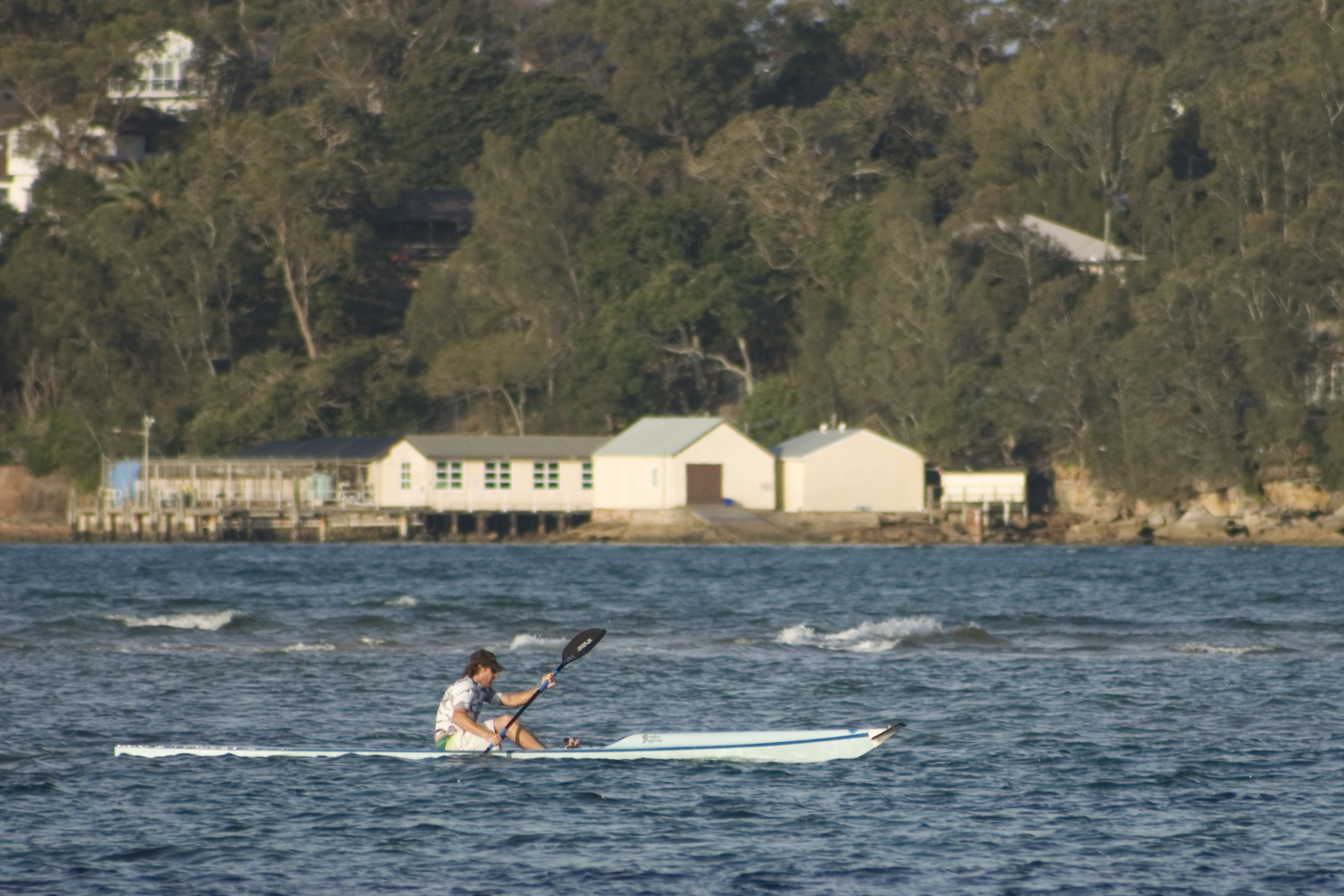
Bundeena NSW 2230, Australia – Panorama #15

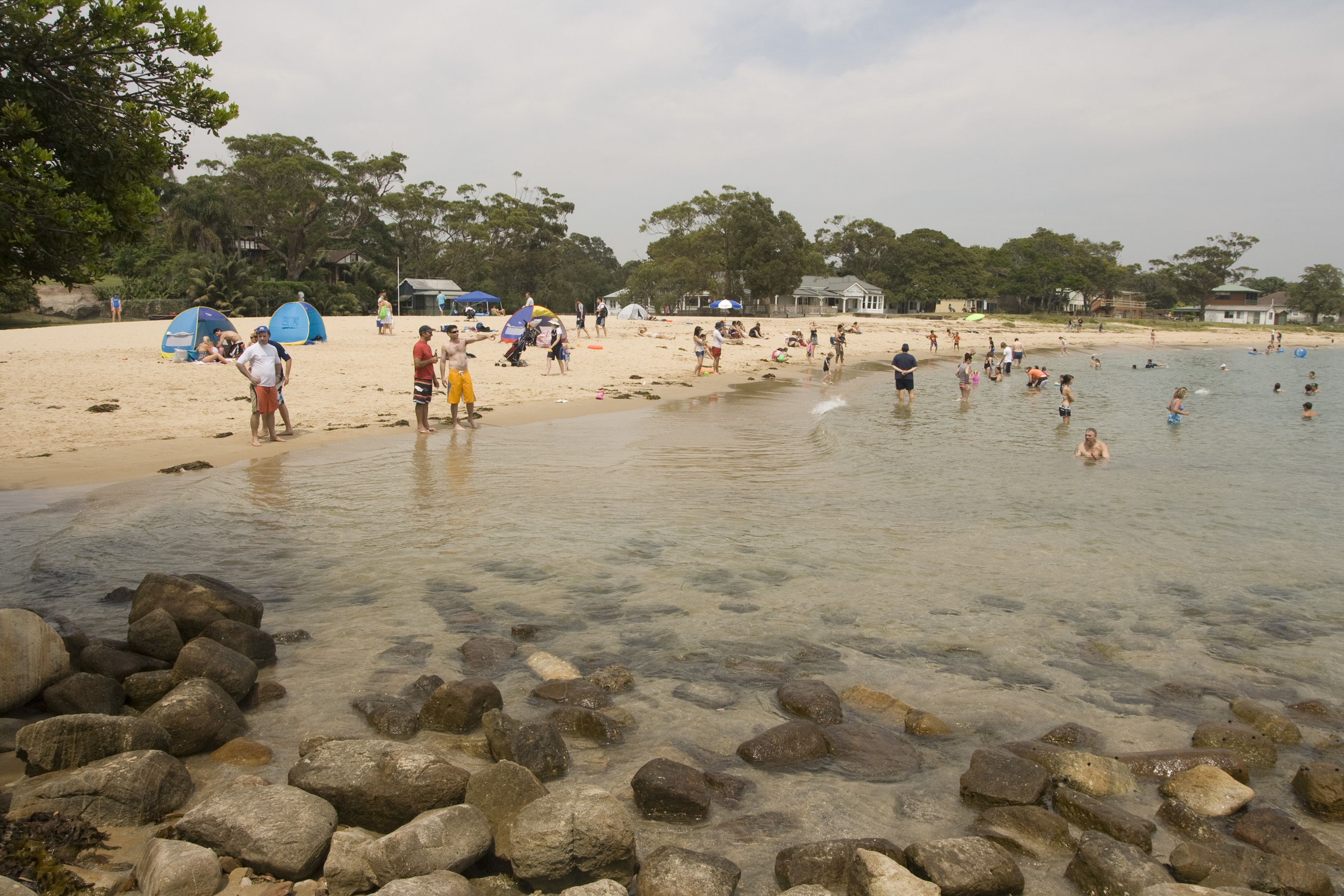
Bundeena NSW 2230, Australia – Panorama #16

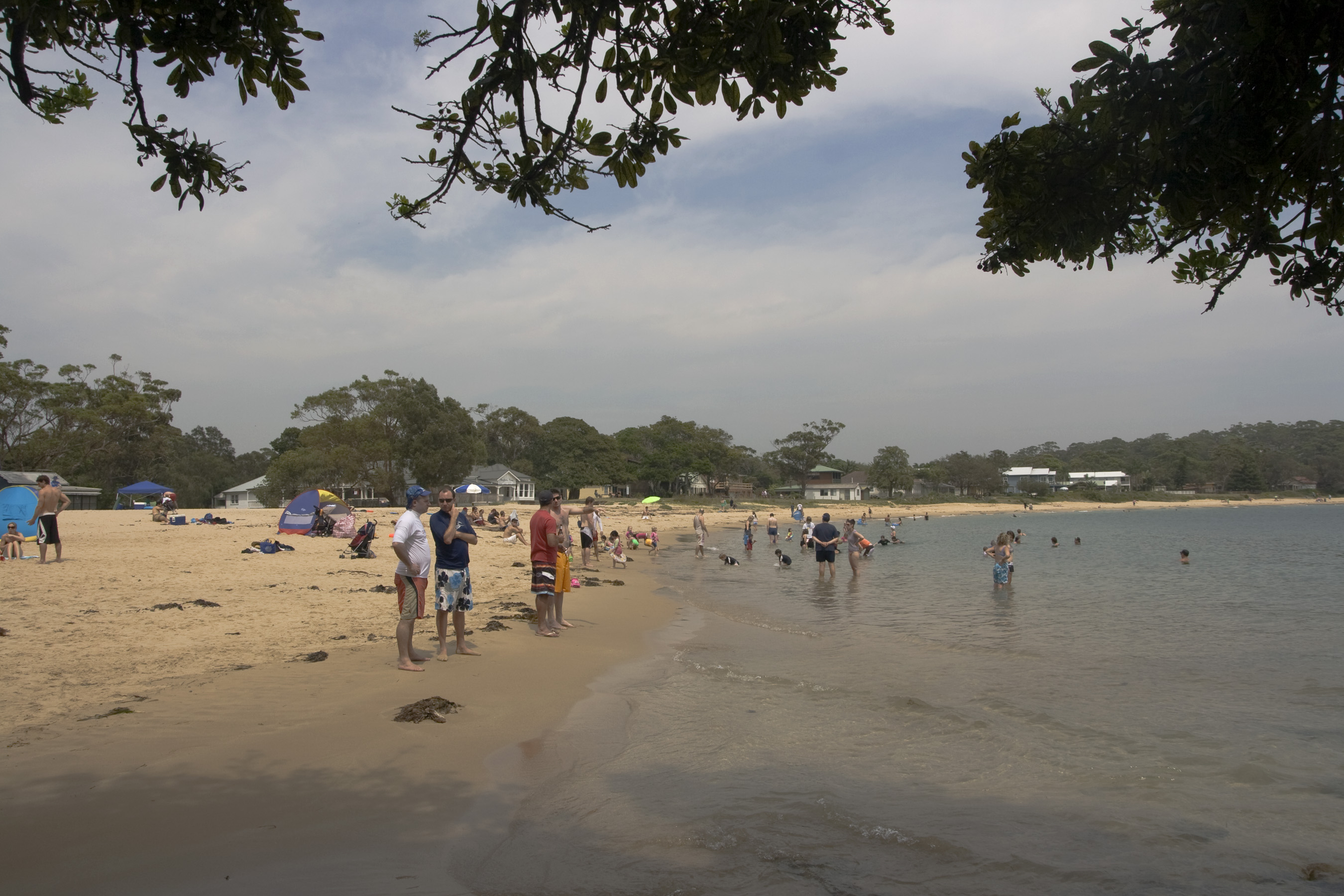
Bundeena NSW 2230, Australia – Panorama #17

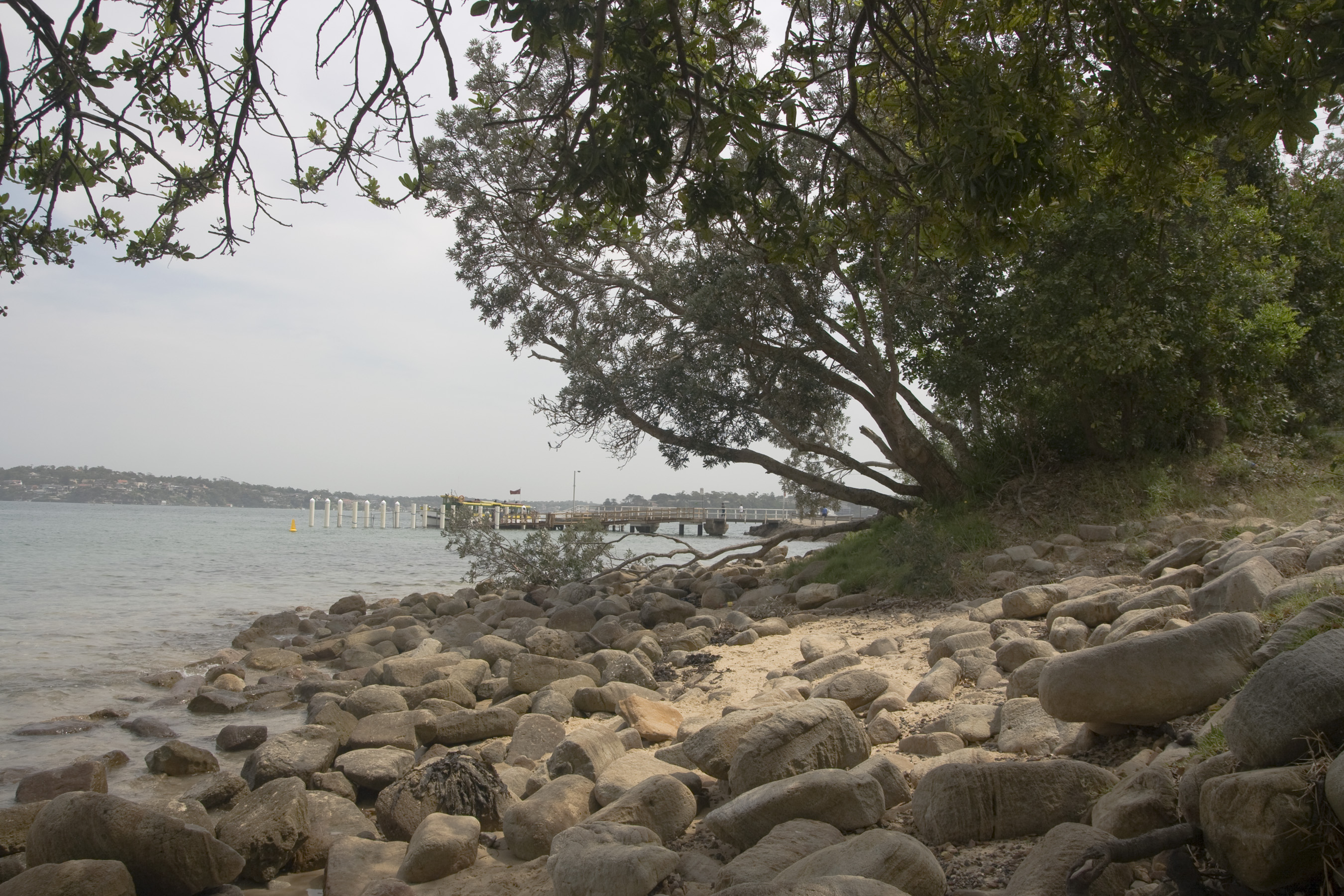
Bundeena NSW 2230, Australia – Panorama #18

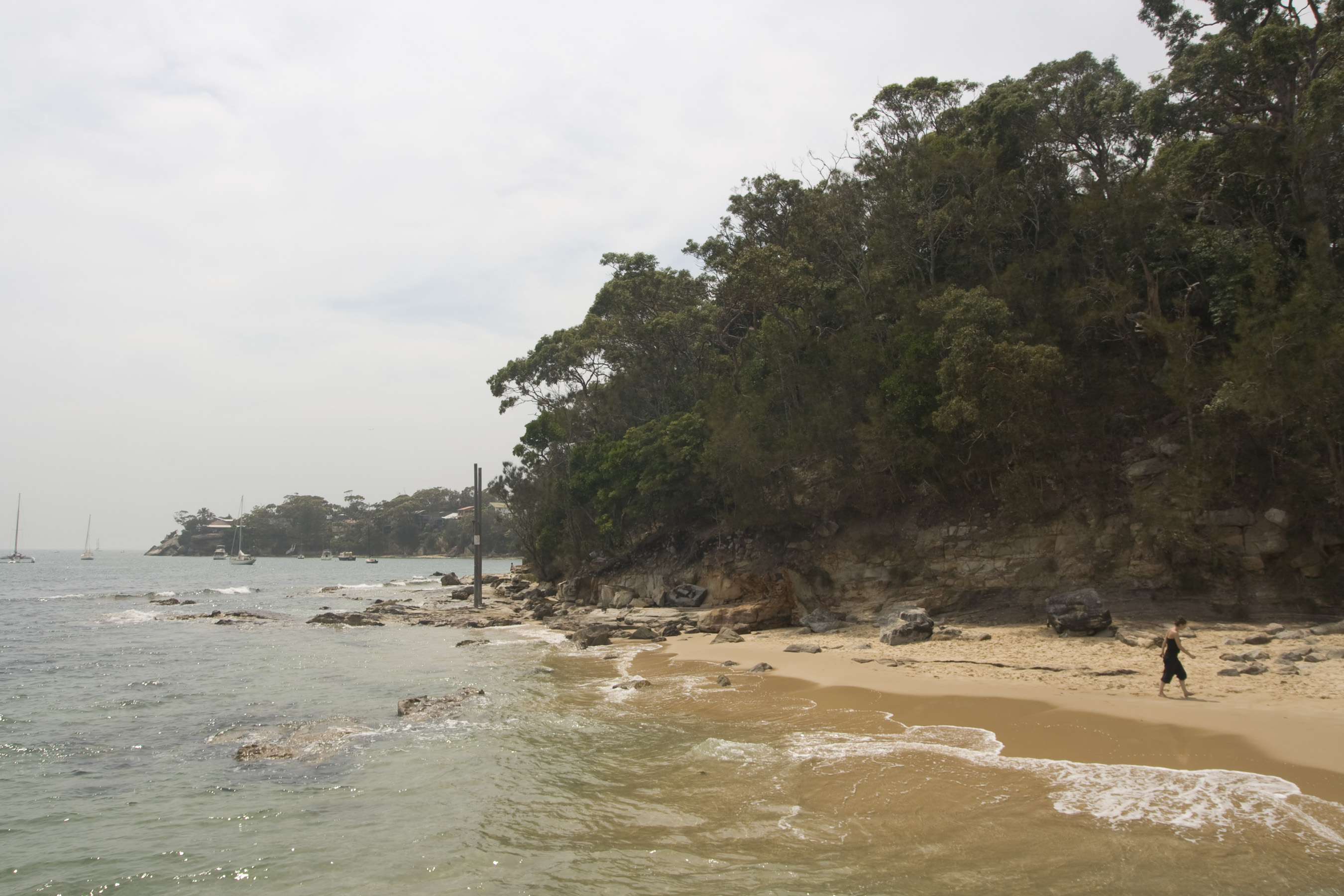
Bundeena NSW 2230, Australia – Panorama #19

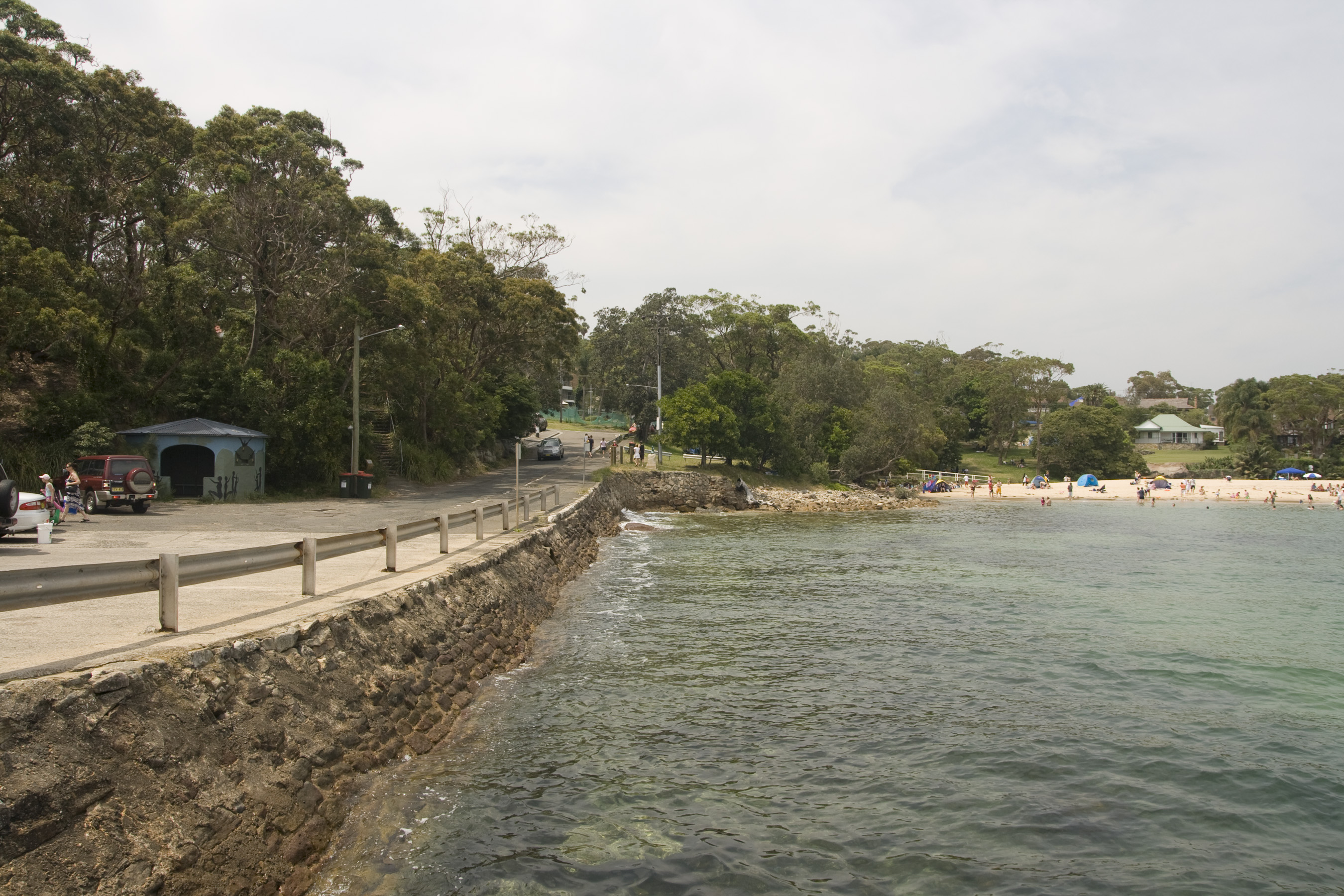
Bundeena NSW 2230, Australia – Panorama #20

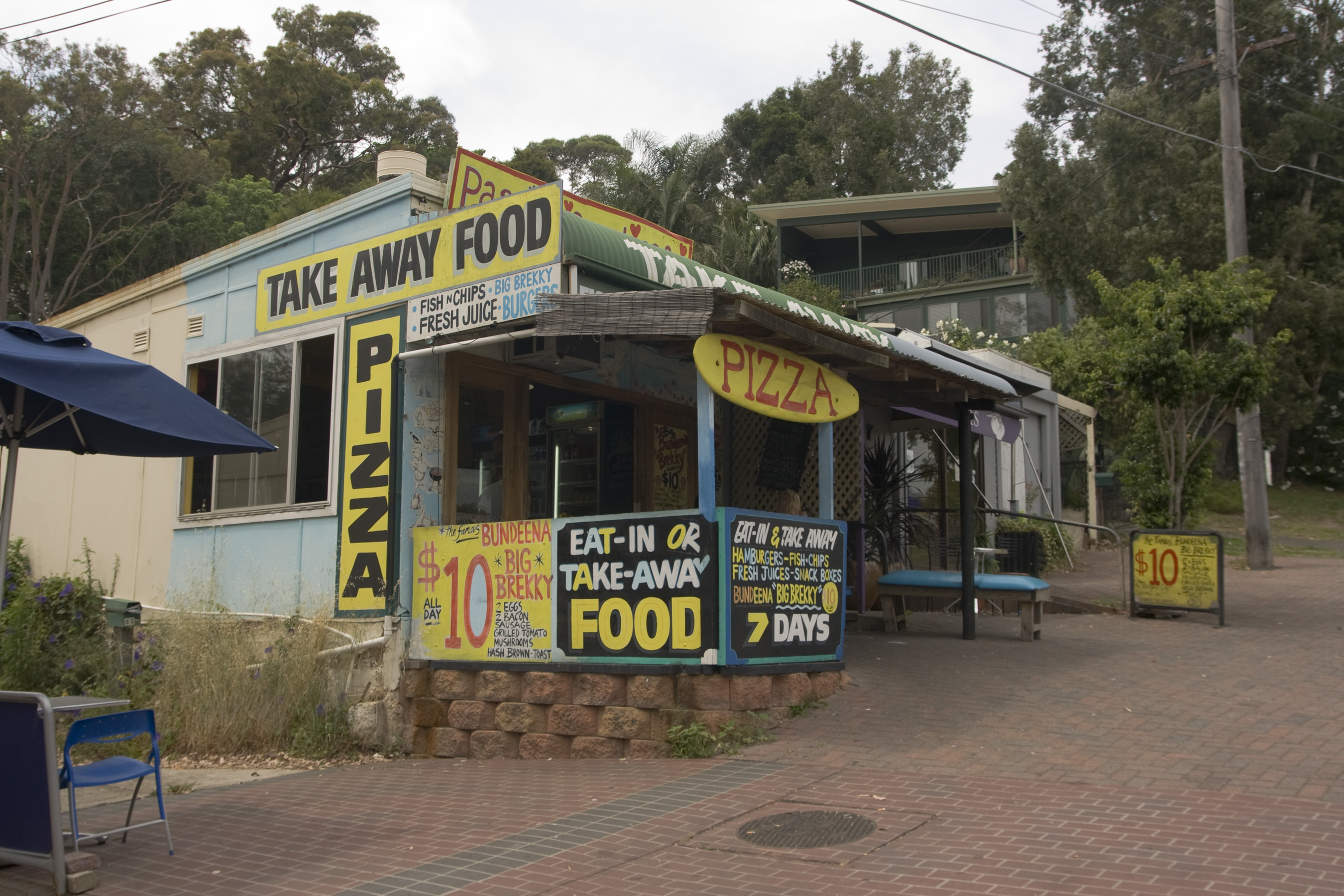
Bundeena NSW 2230, Australia – Panorama #21

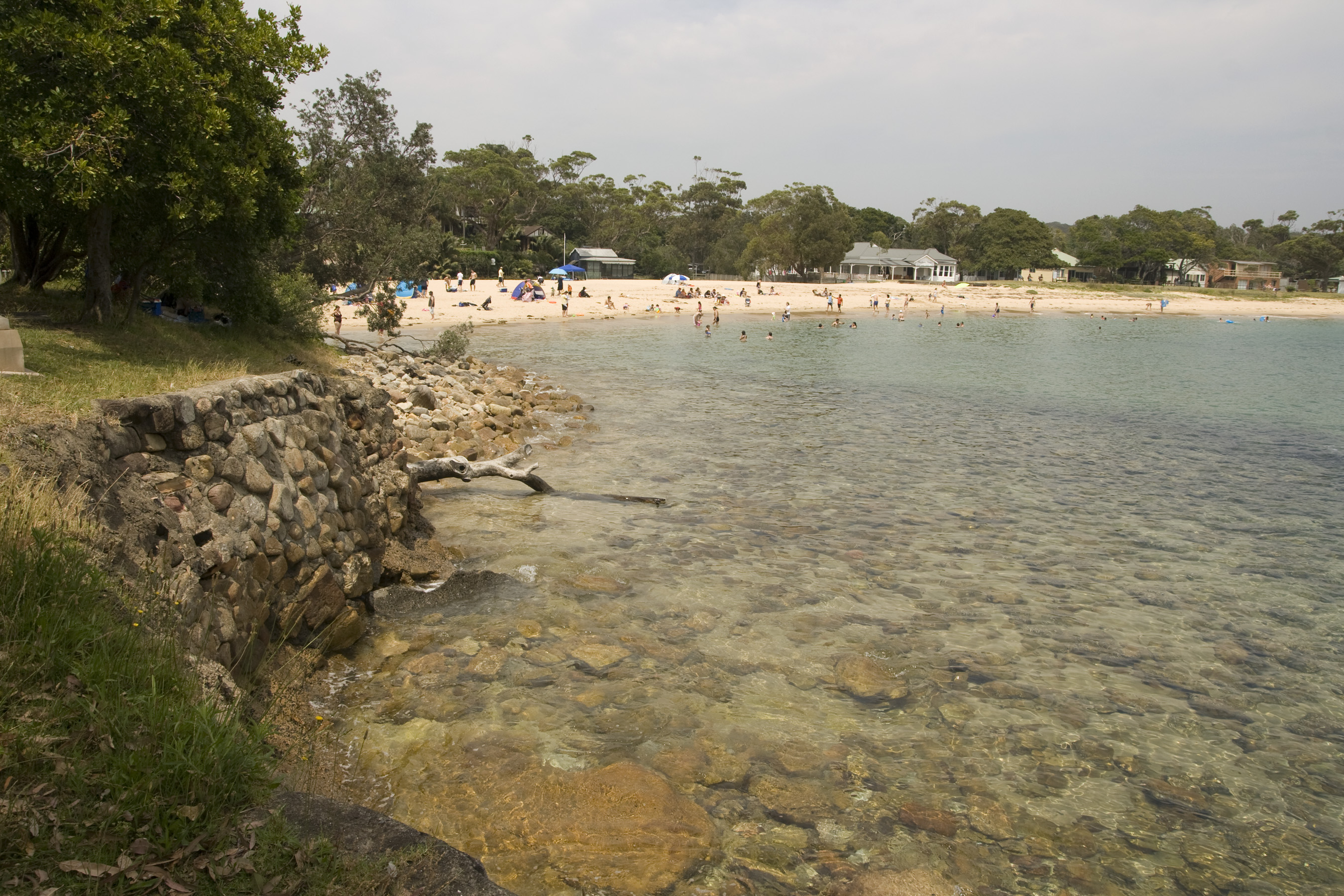
Bundeena NSW 2230, Australia – Panorama #22

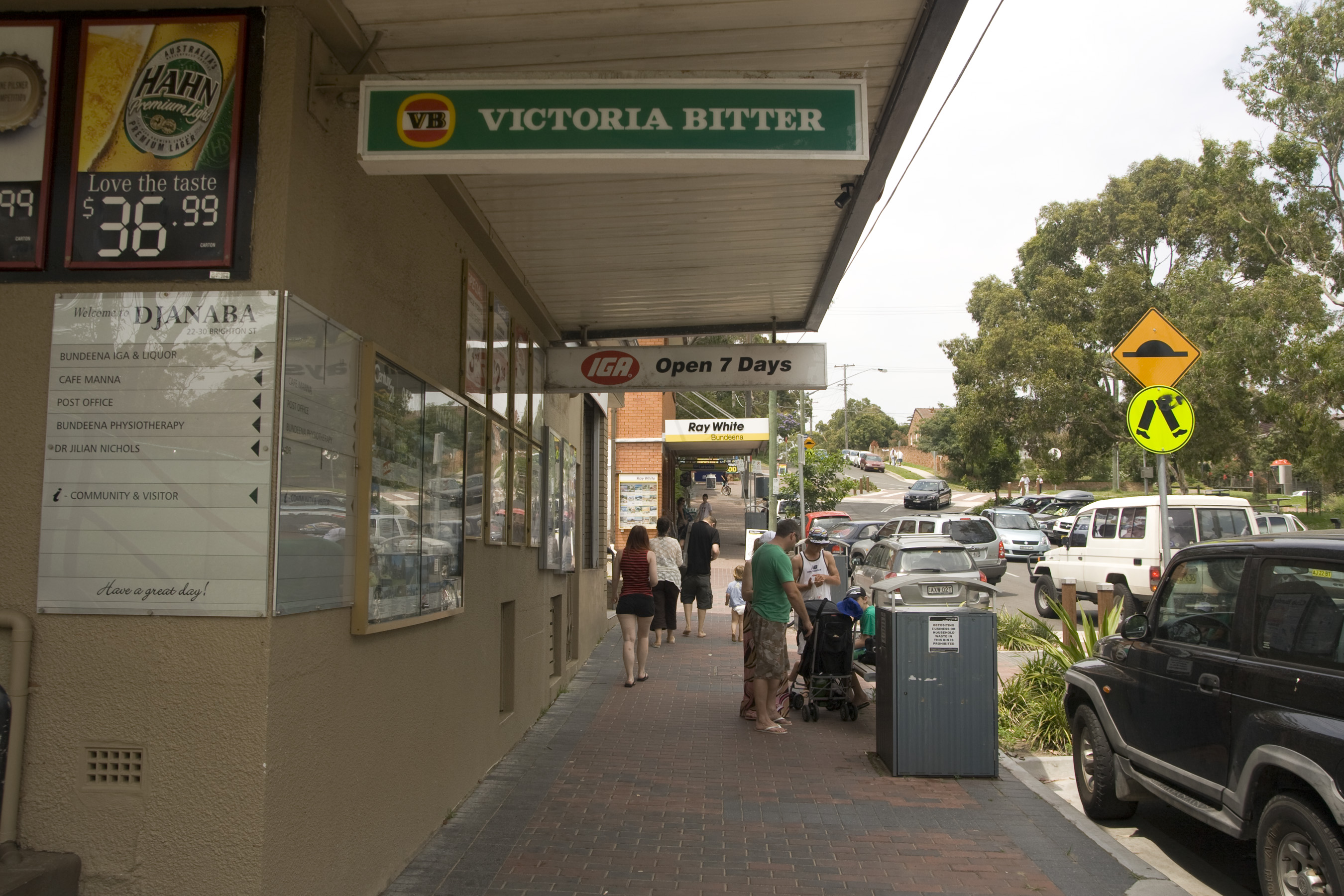
Bundeena NSW 2230, Australia – Panorama #23

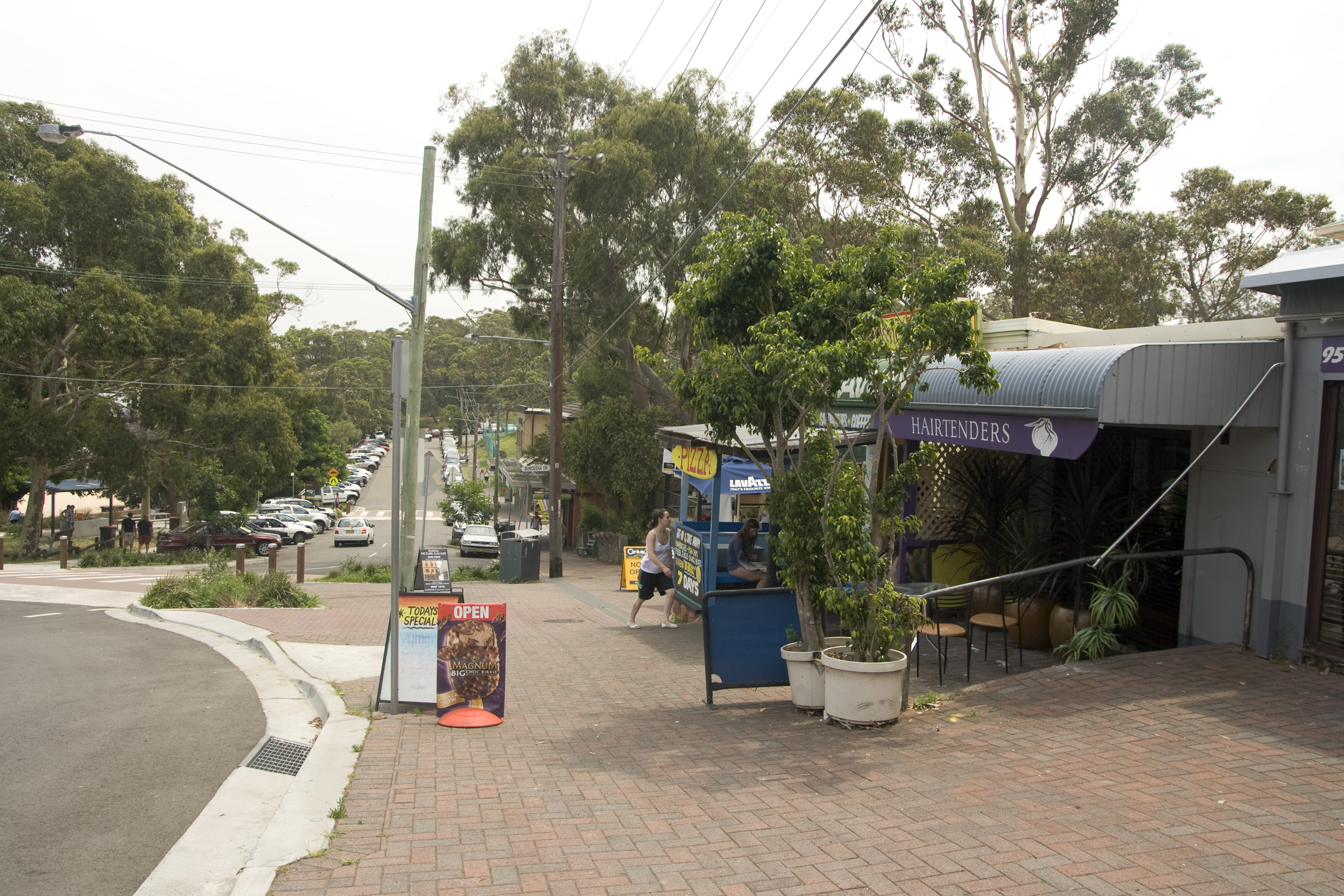
Bundeena NSW 2230, Australia – Panorama #24

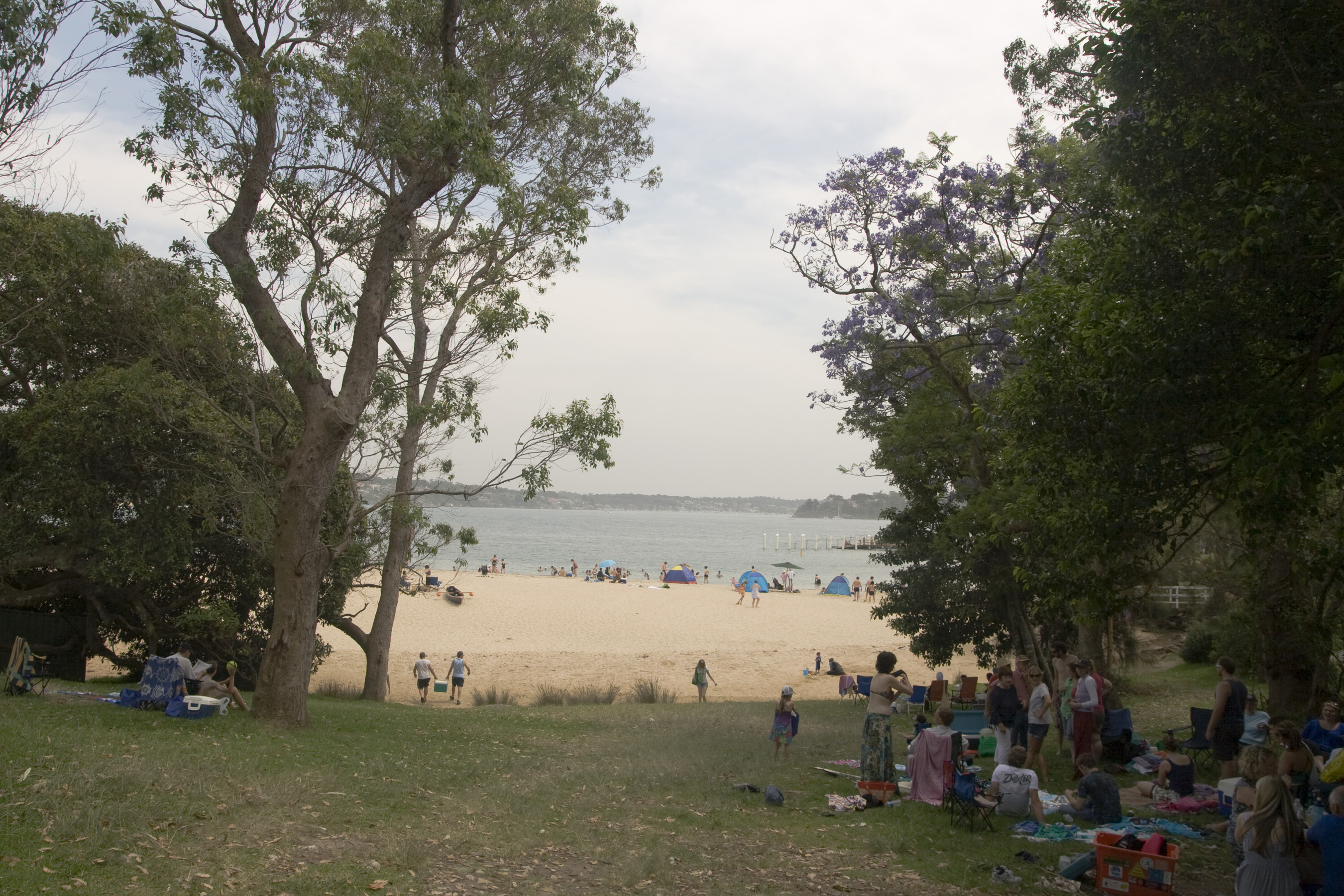
Bundeena NSW 2230, Australia – Panorama #25

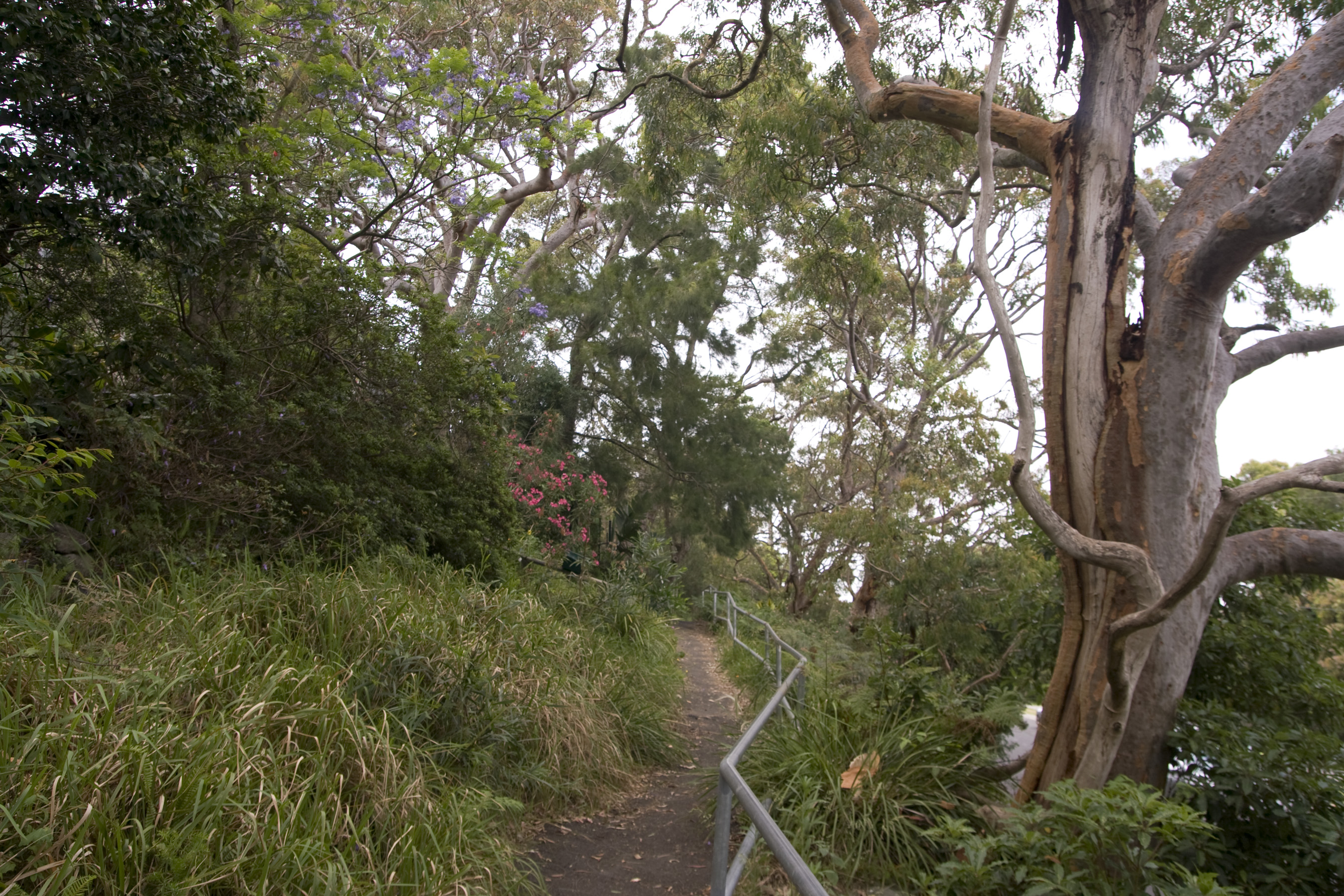
Bundeena NSW 2230, Australia – Panorama #26

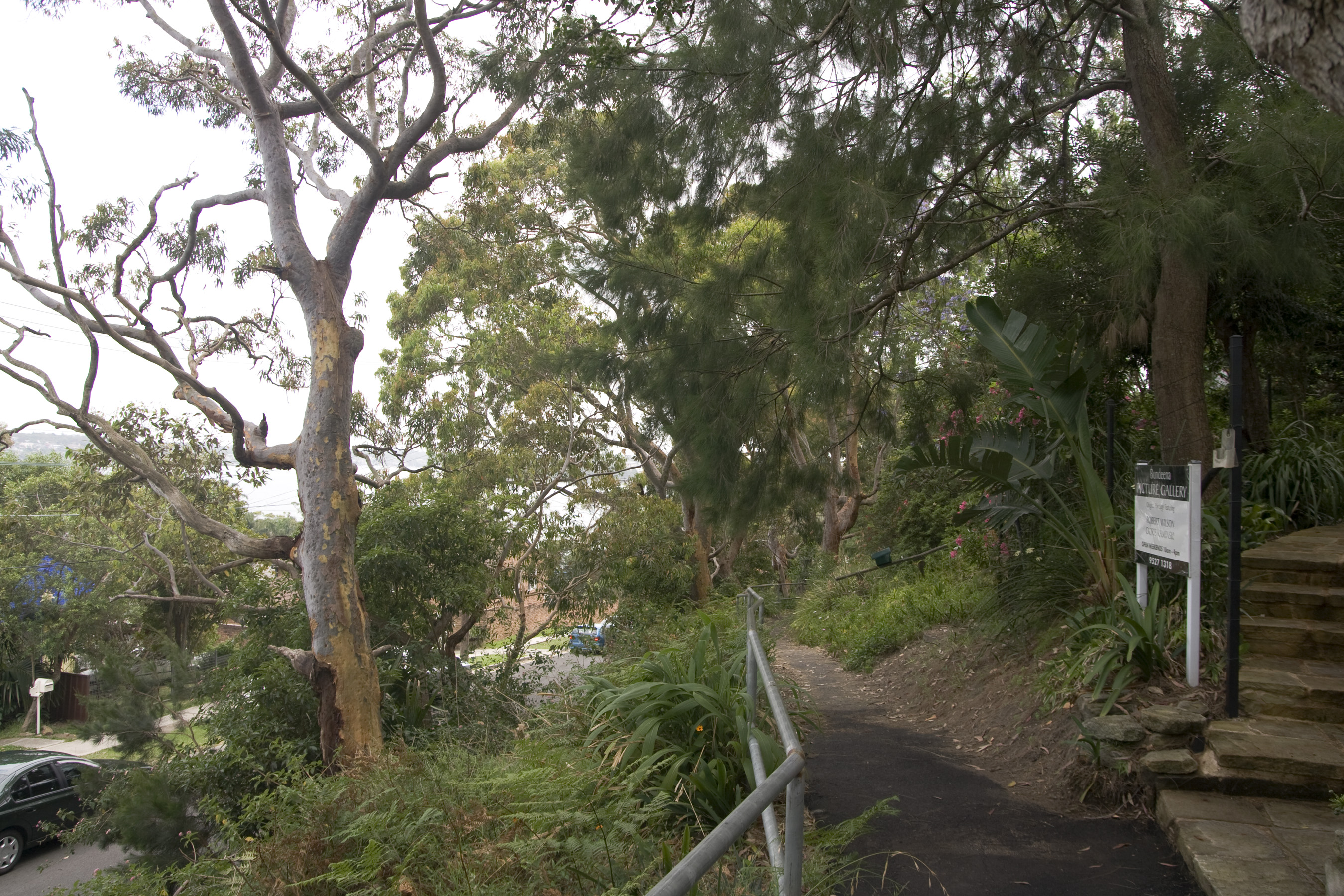
Bundeena NSW 2230, Australia – Panorama #27

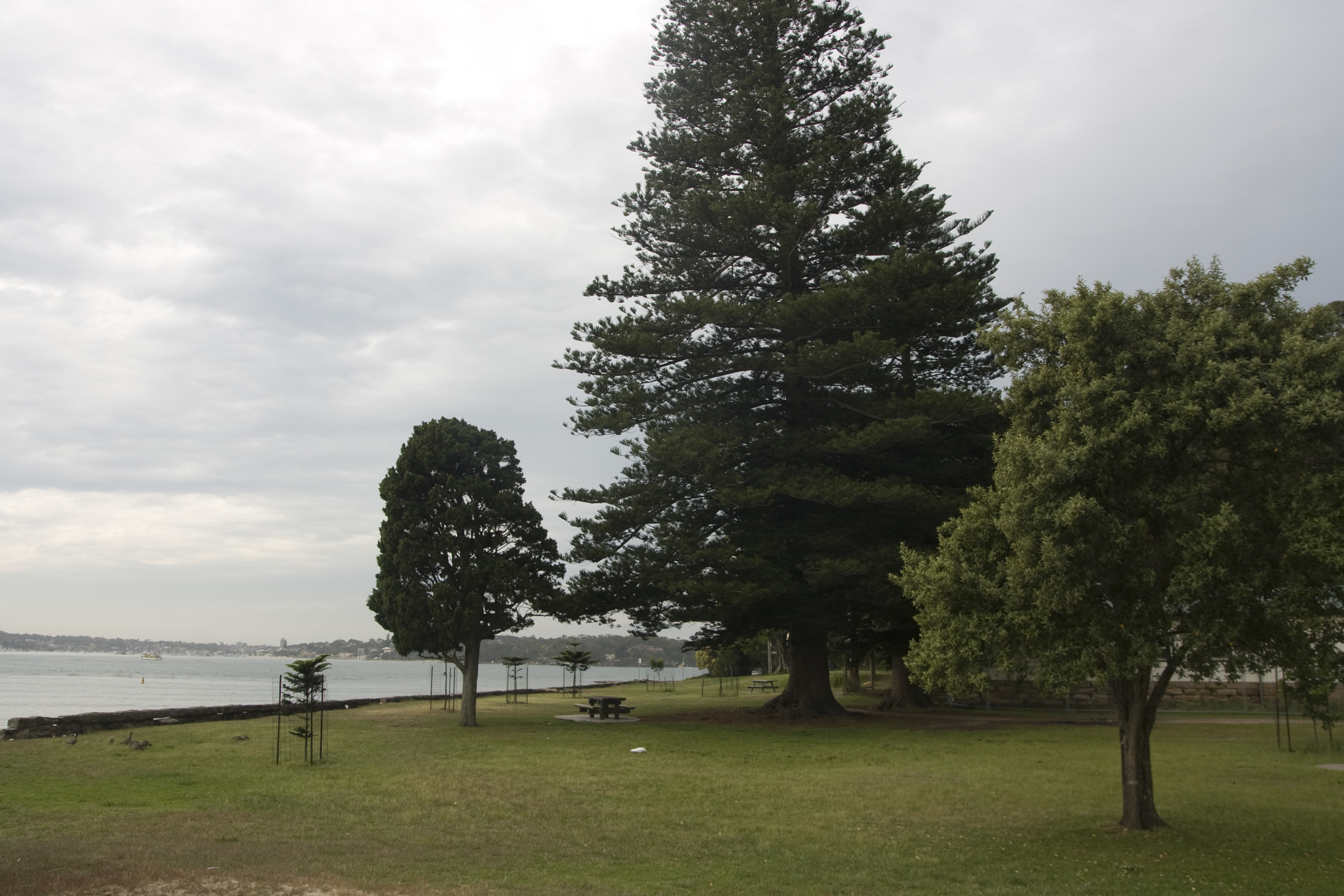
Bundeena NSW 2230, Australia – Panorama #28

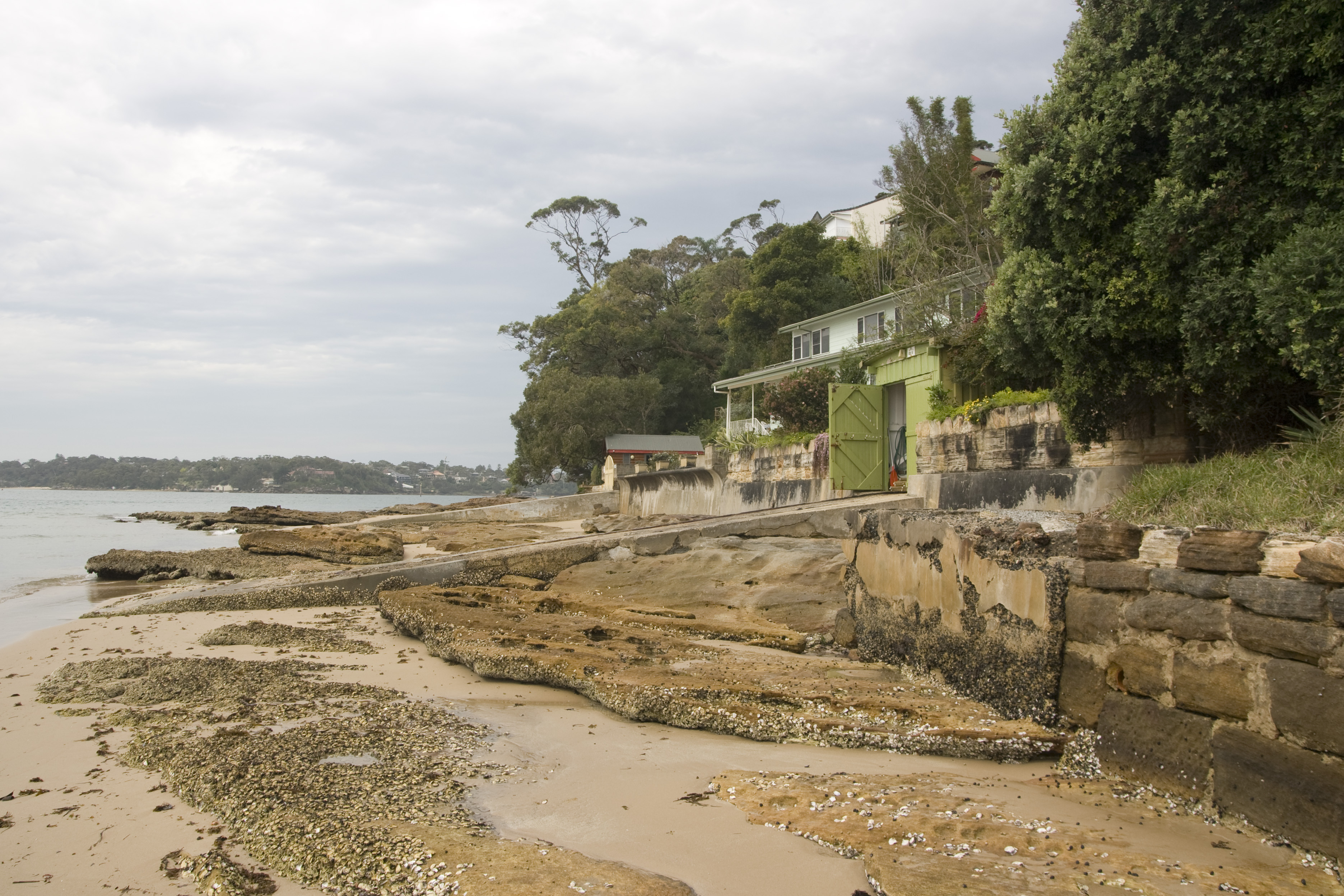
Bundeena NSW 2230, Australia – Panorama #29

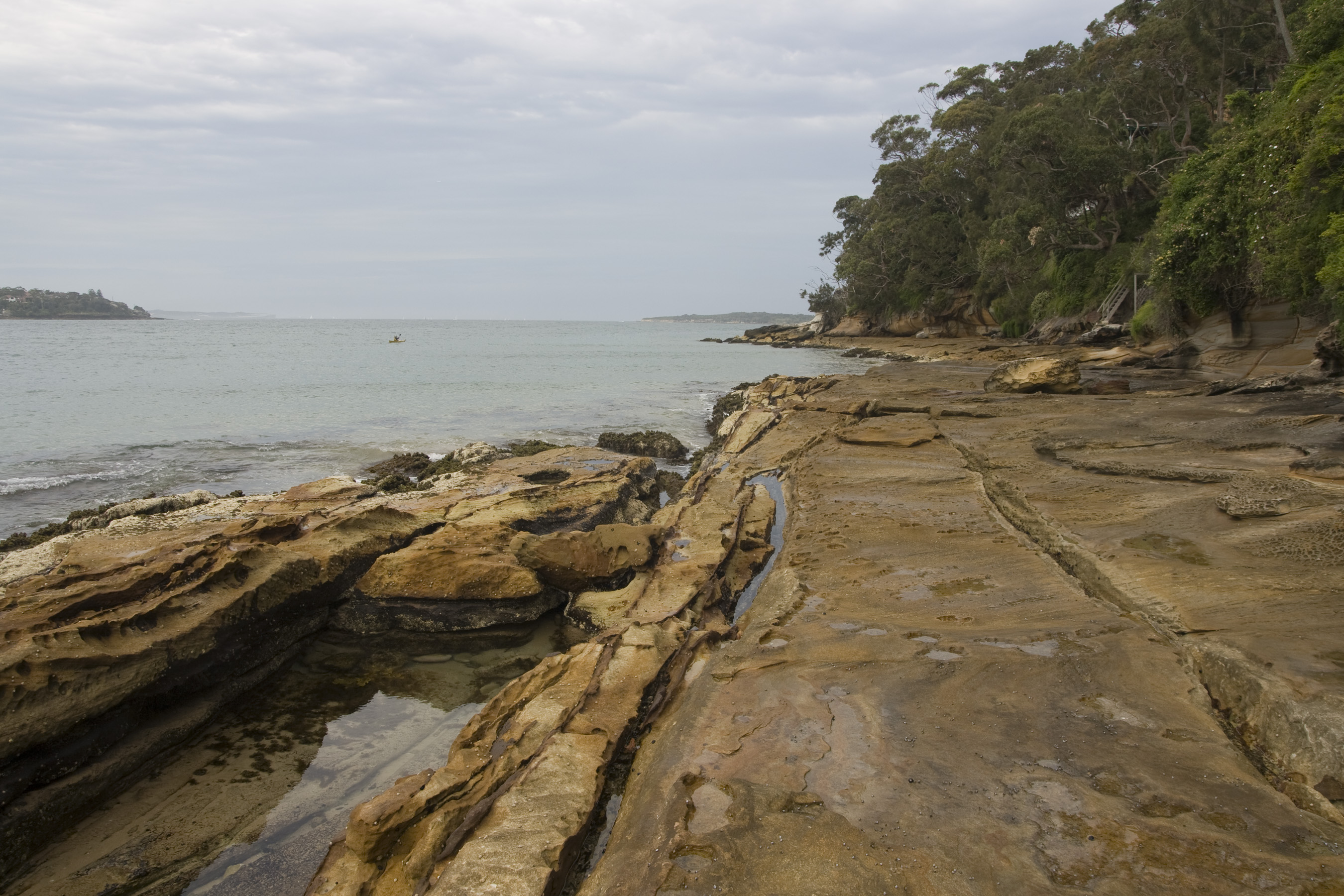
Bundeena NSW 2230, Australia – Panorama #30

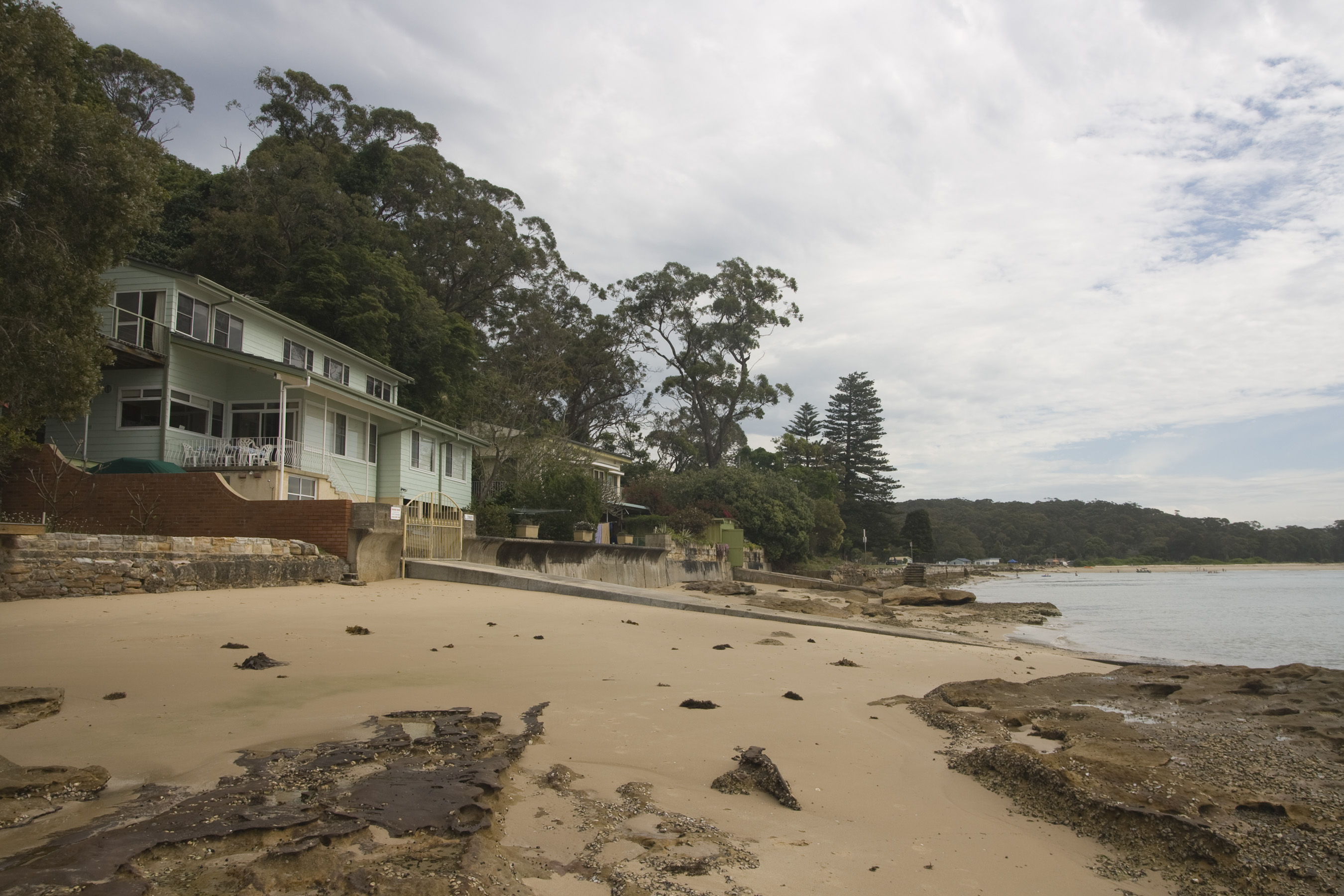
Bundeena NSW 2230, Australia – Panorama #31

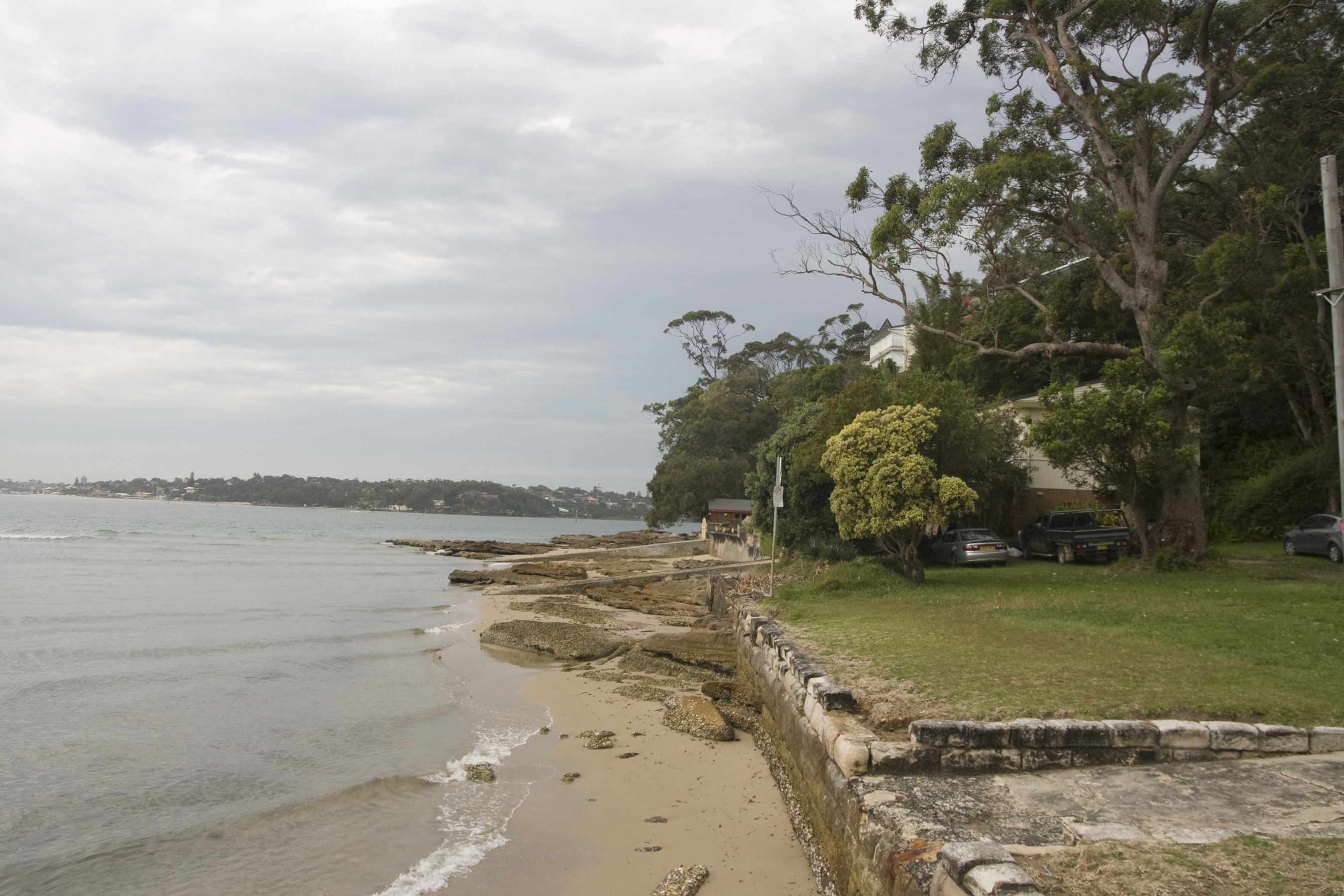
Bundeena NSW 2230, Australia – Panorama #32

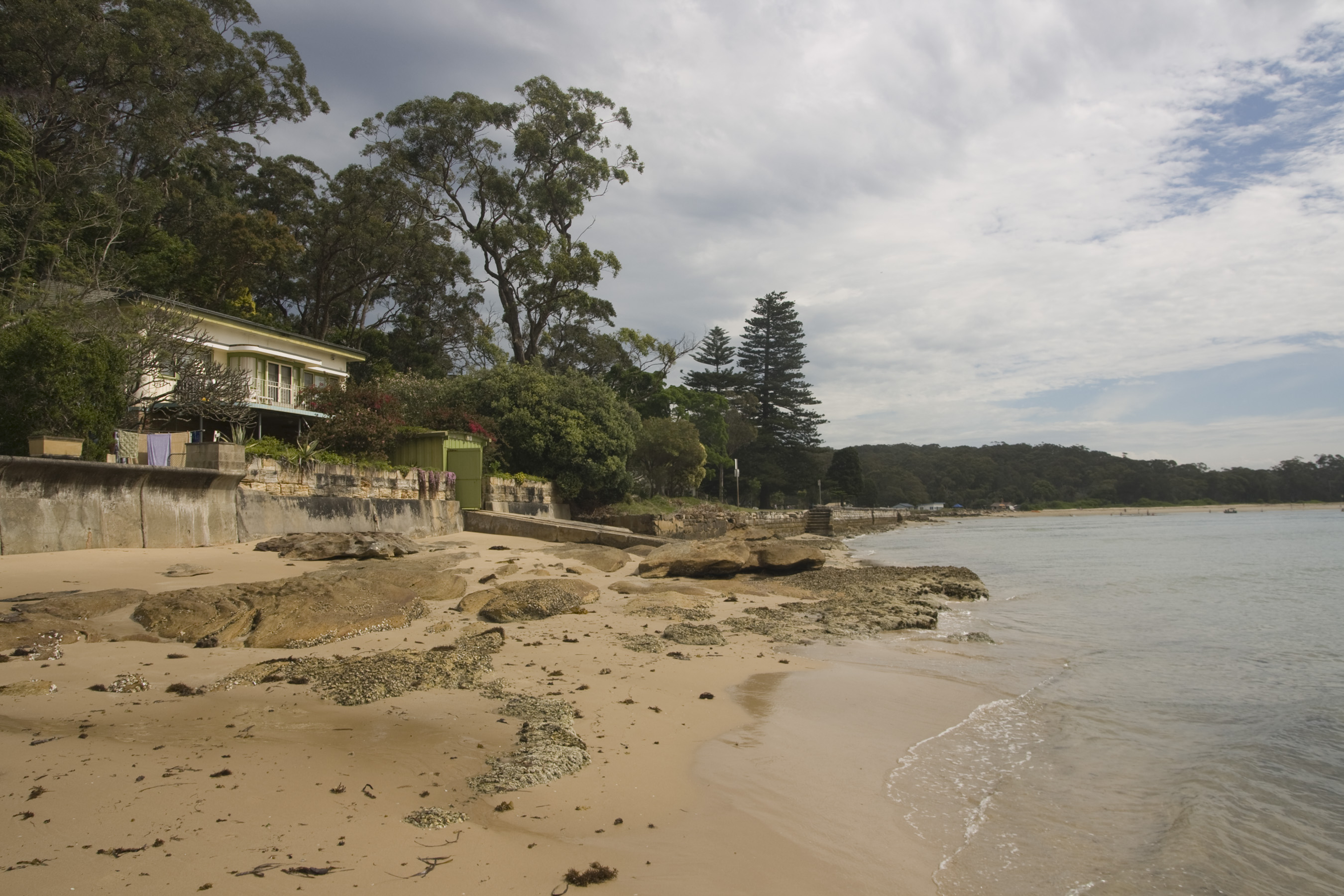
Bundeena NSW 2230, Australia – Panorama #33

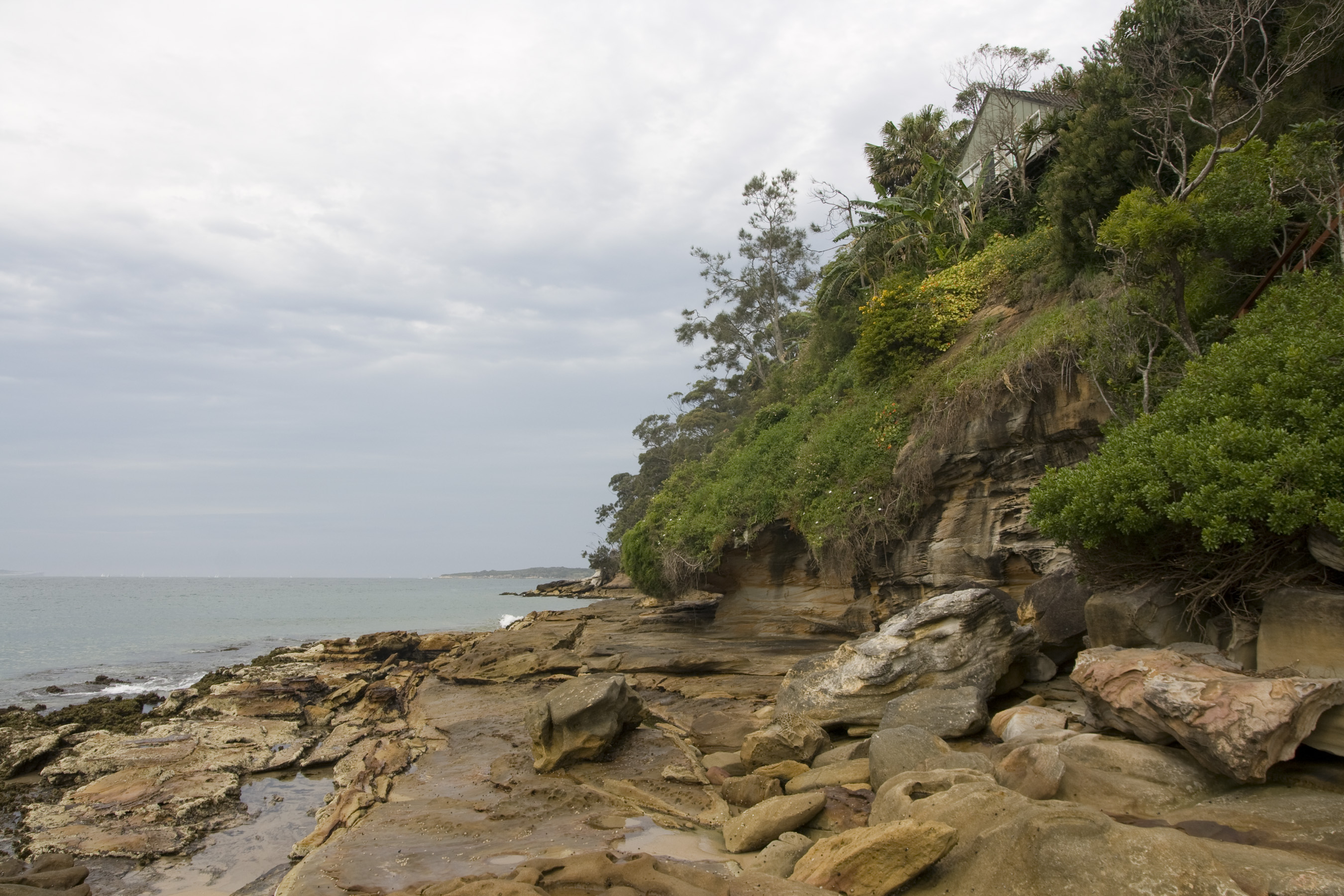
Bundeena NSW 2230, Australia – Panorama #34

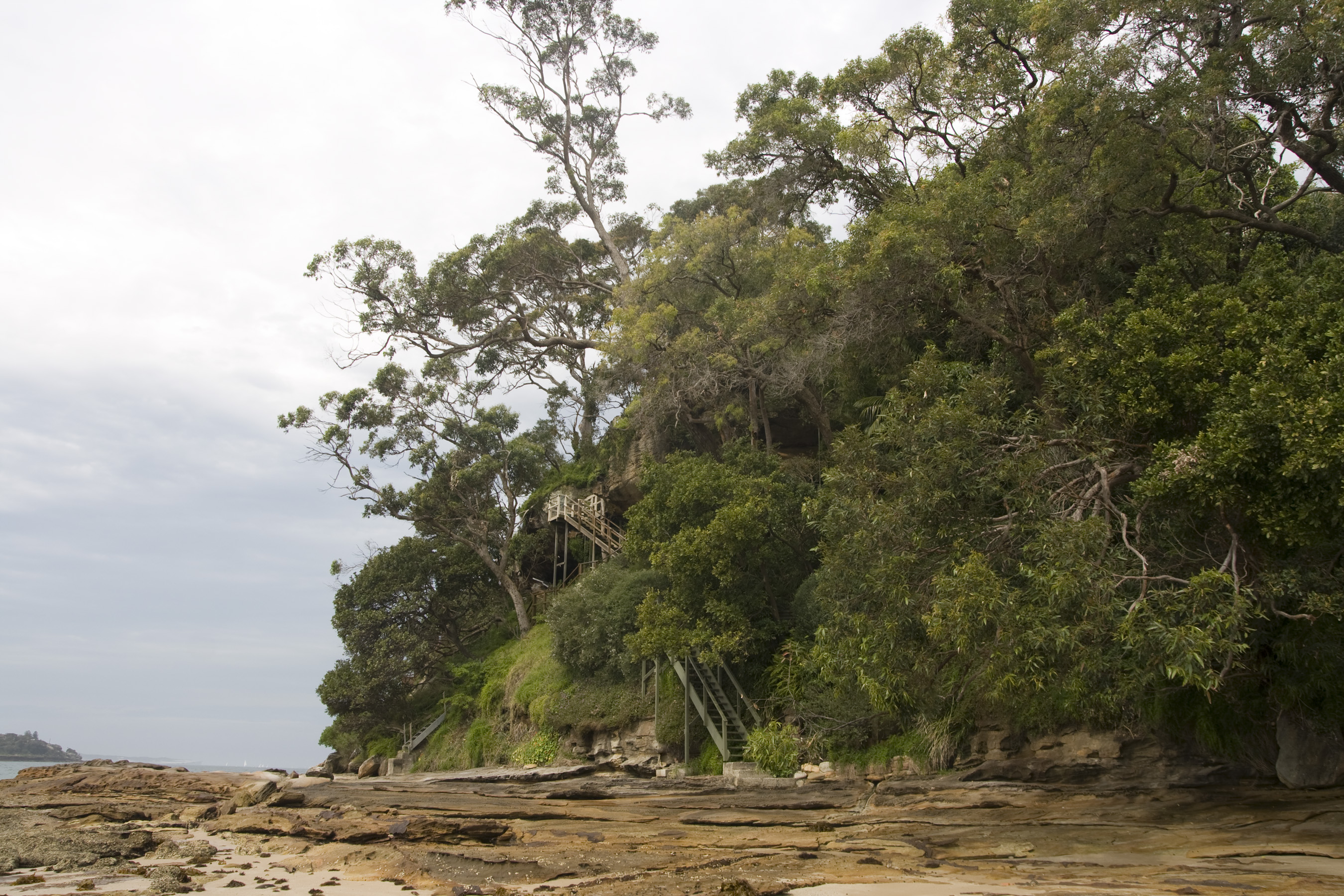
Bundeena NSW 2230, Australia – Panorama #35

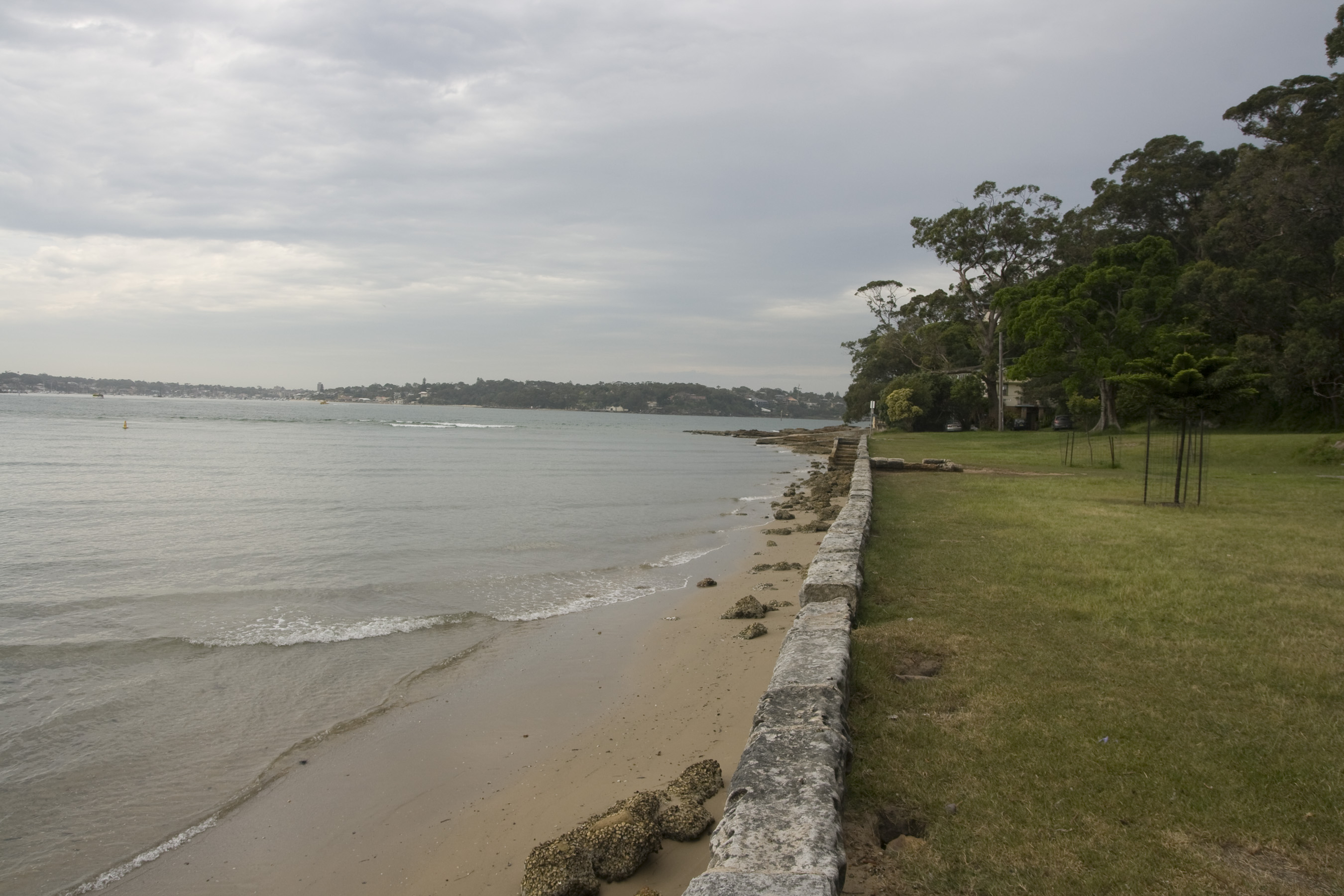
Bundeena NSW 2230, Australia – Panorama #36

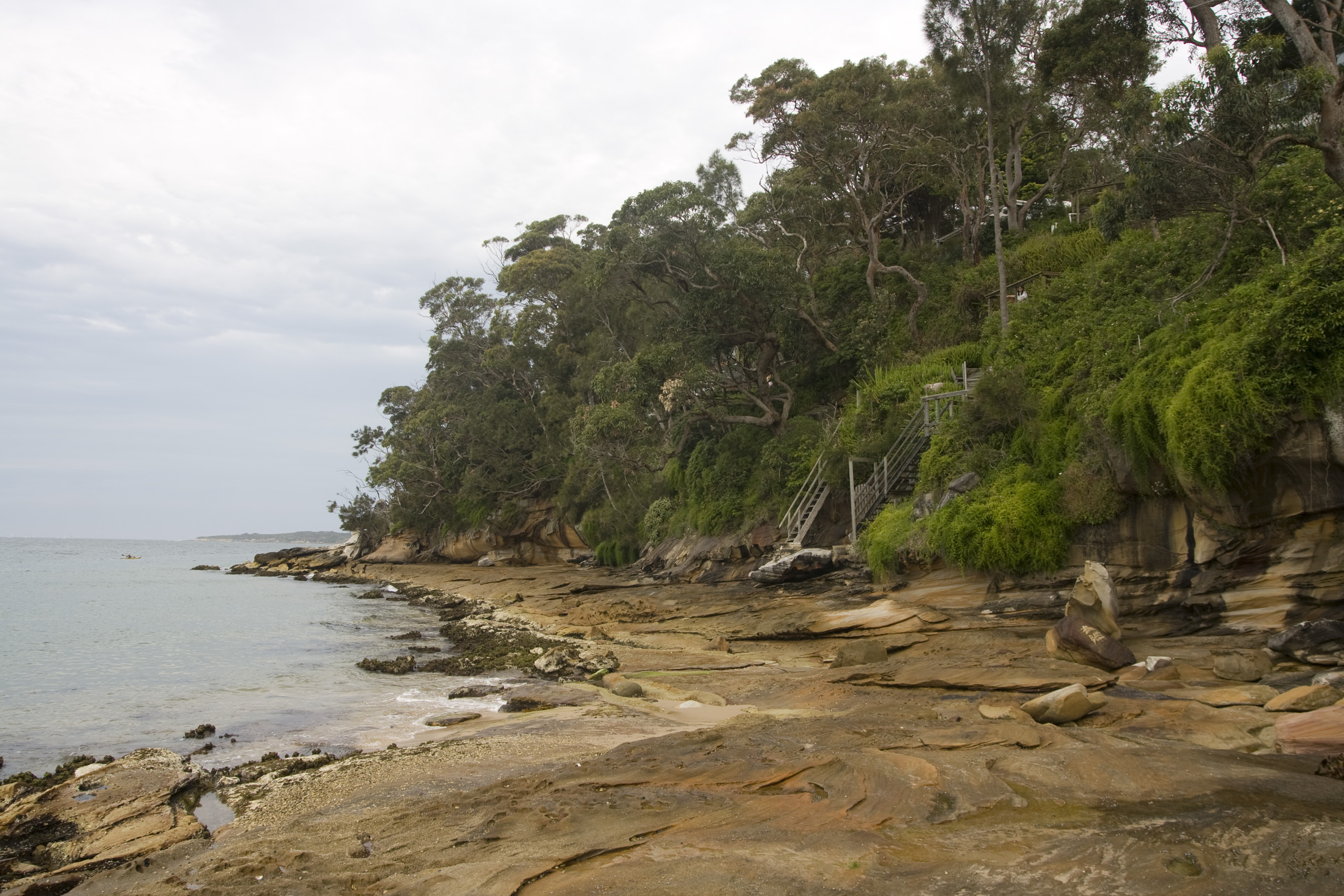
Bundeena NSW 2230, Australia – Panorama #37

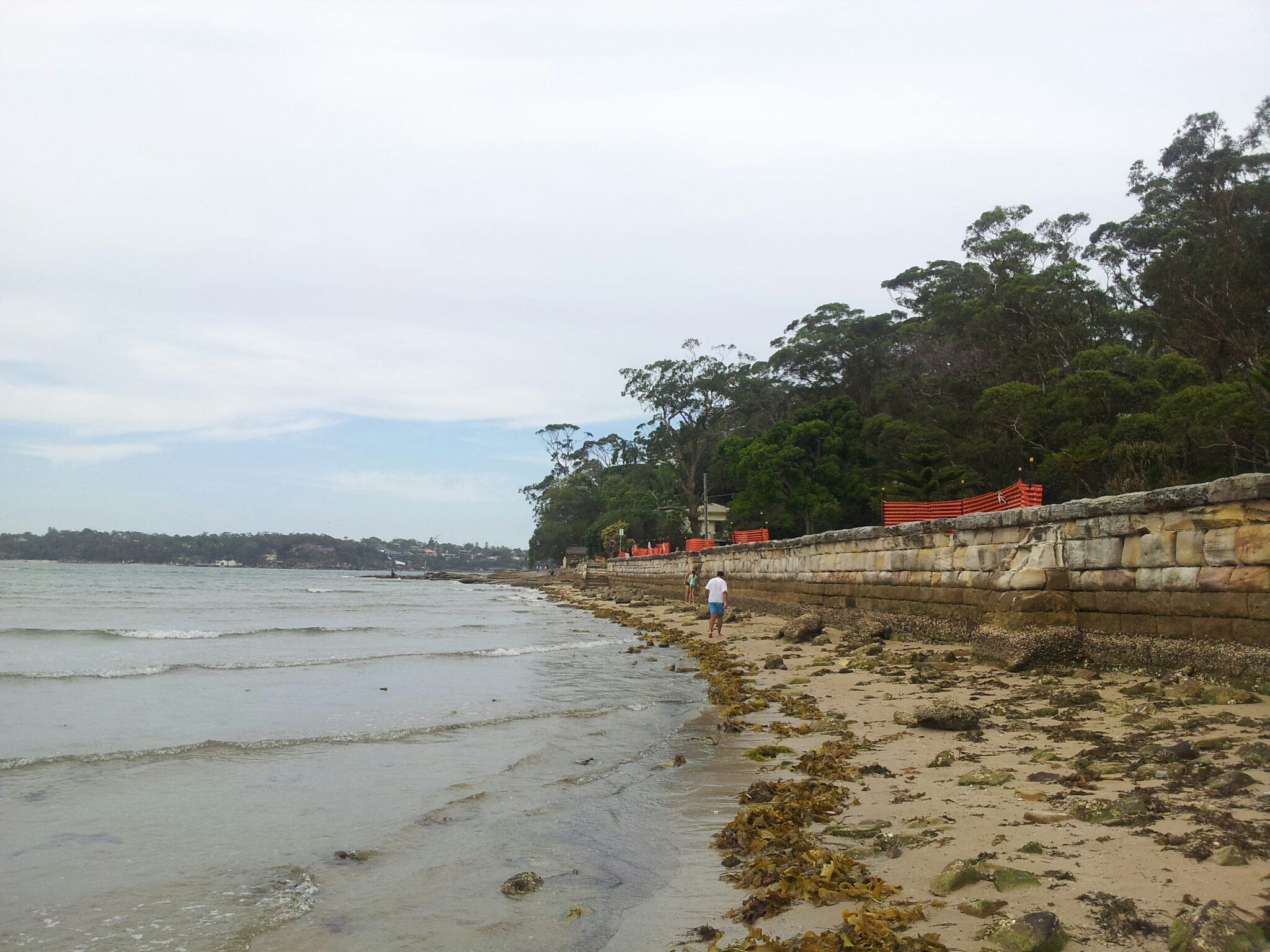
Bundeena NSW 2230, Australia – Panorama #38

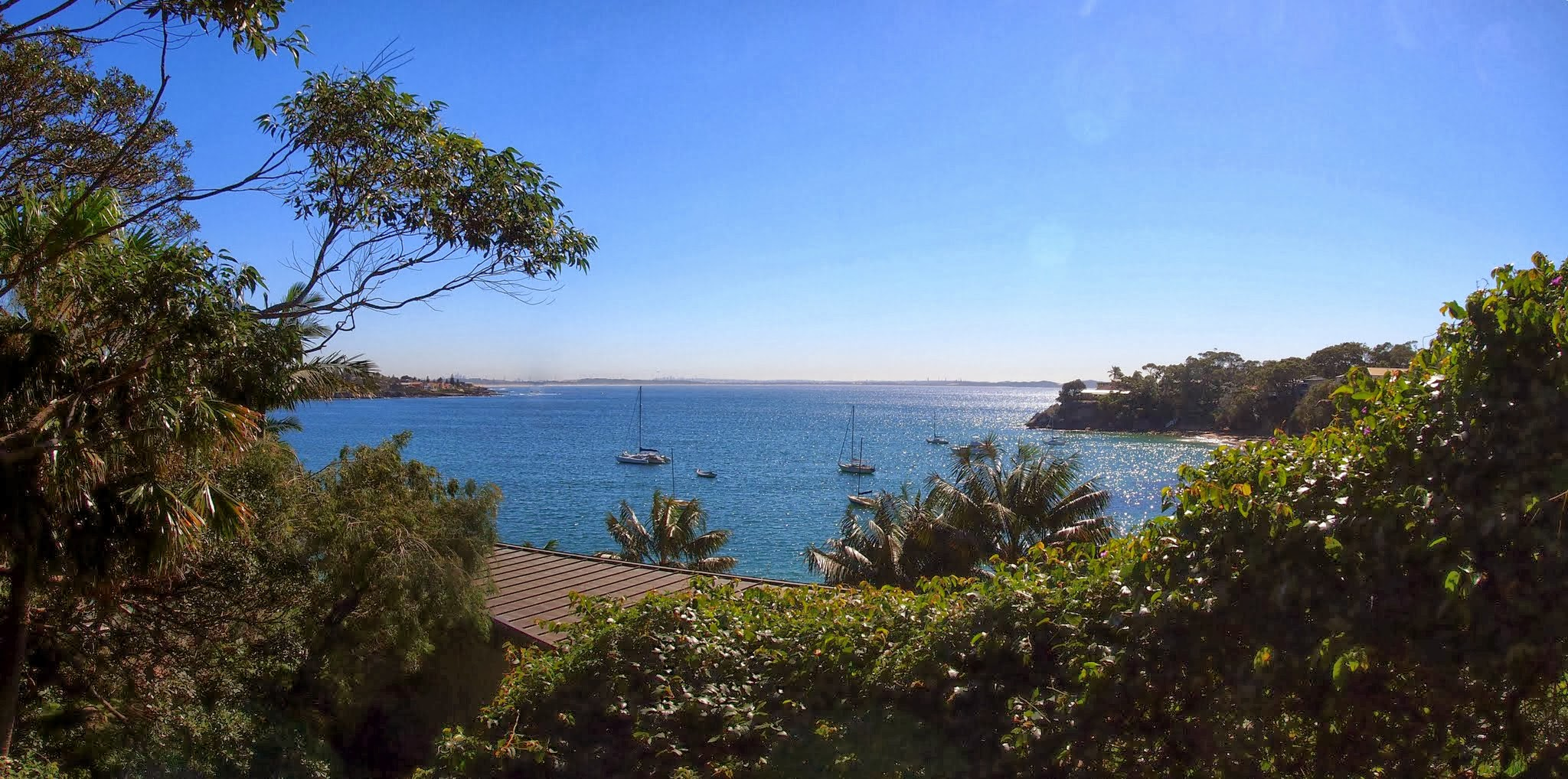
Bundeena NSW 2230, Australia – Panorama #39

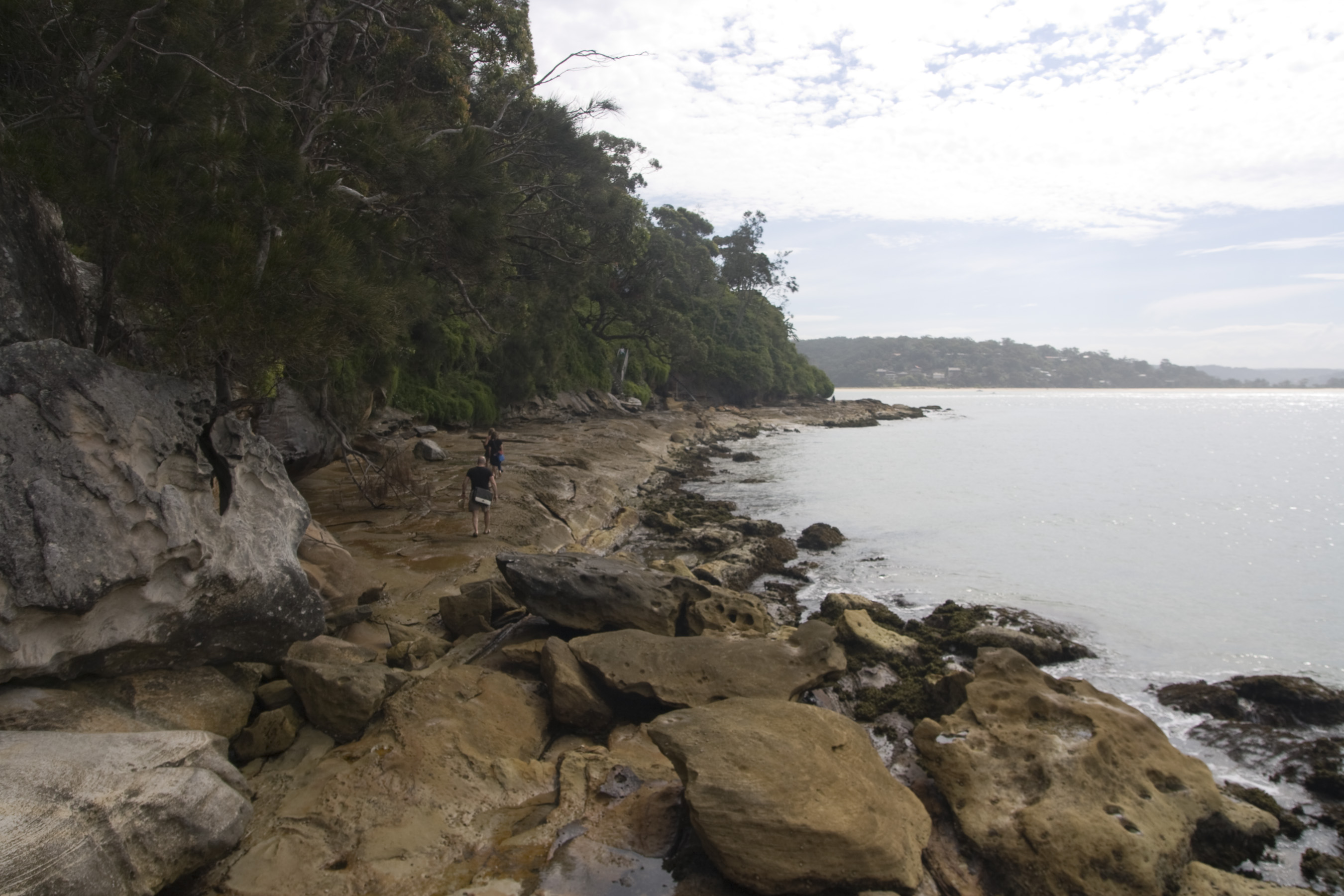
Bundeena NSW 2230, Australia – Panorama #40

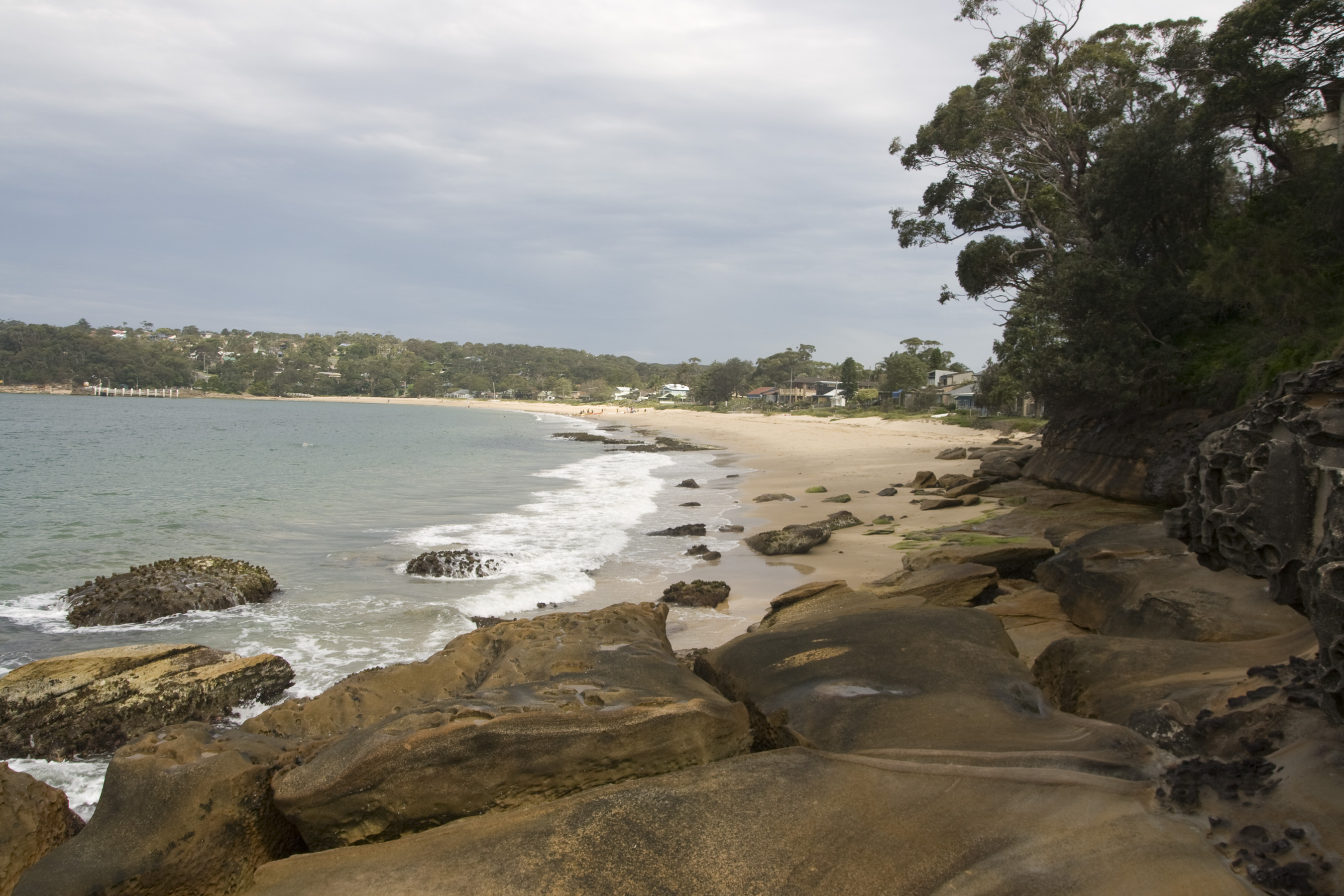
Bundeena NSW 2230, Australia – Panorama #41

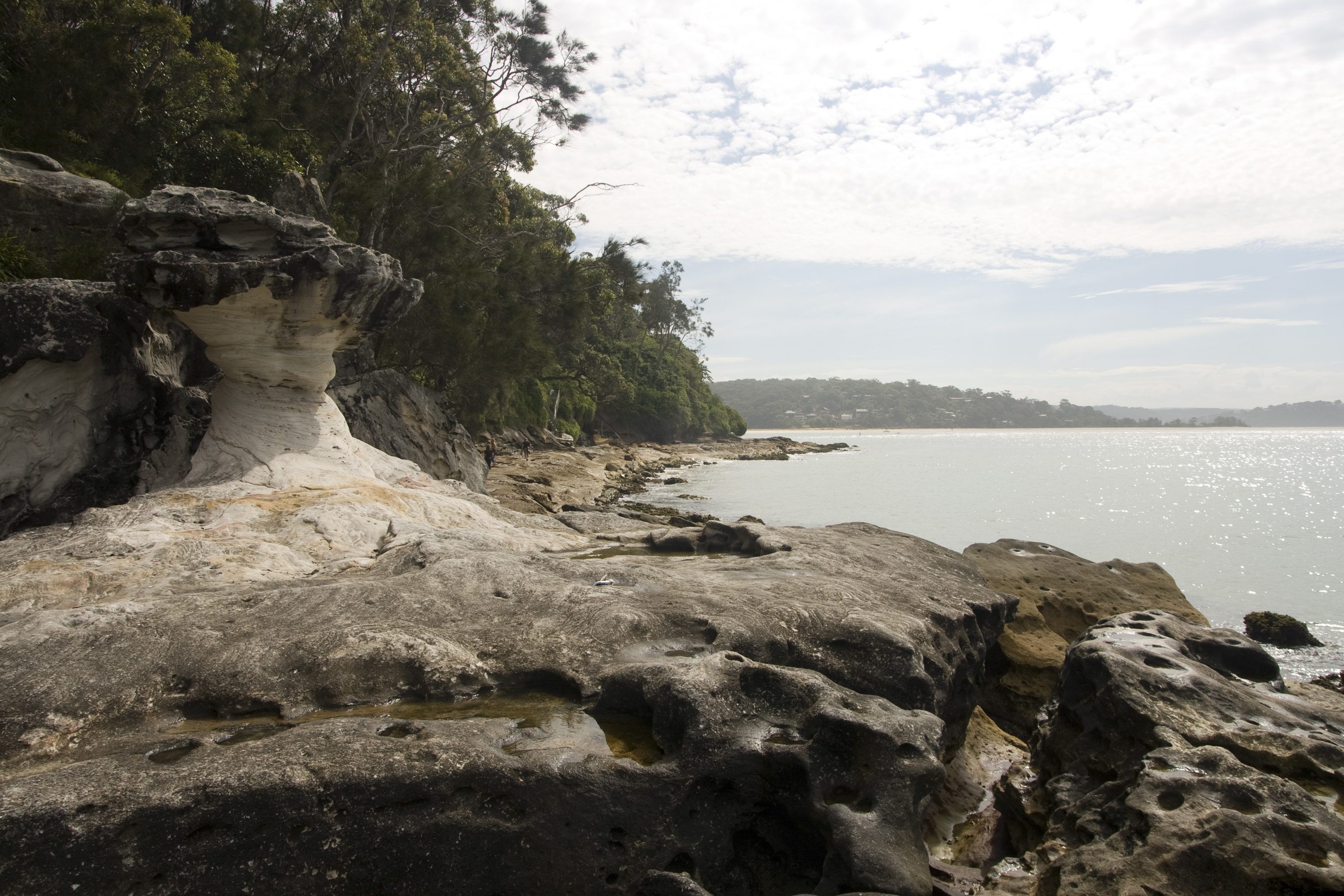
Bundeena NSW 2230, Australia – Panorama #42

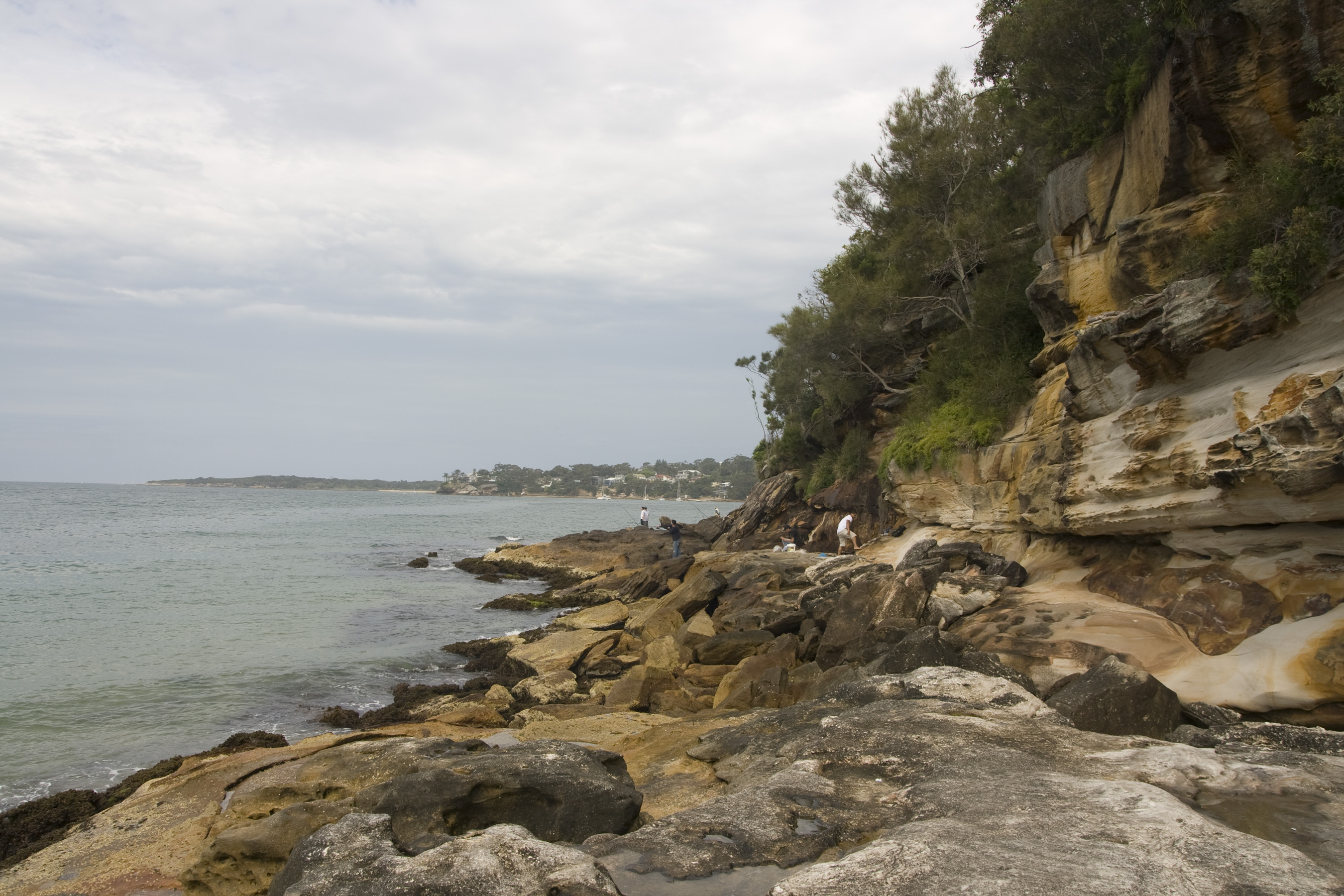
Bundeena NSW 2230, Australia – Panorama #43

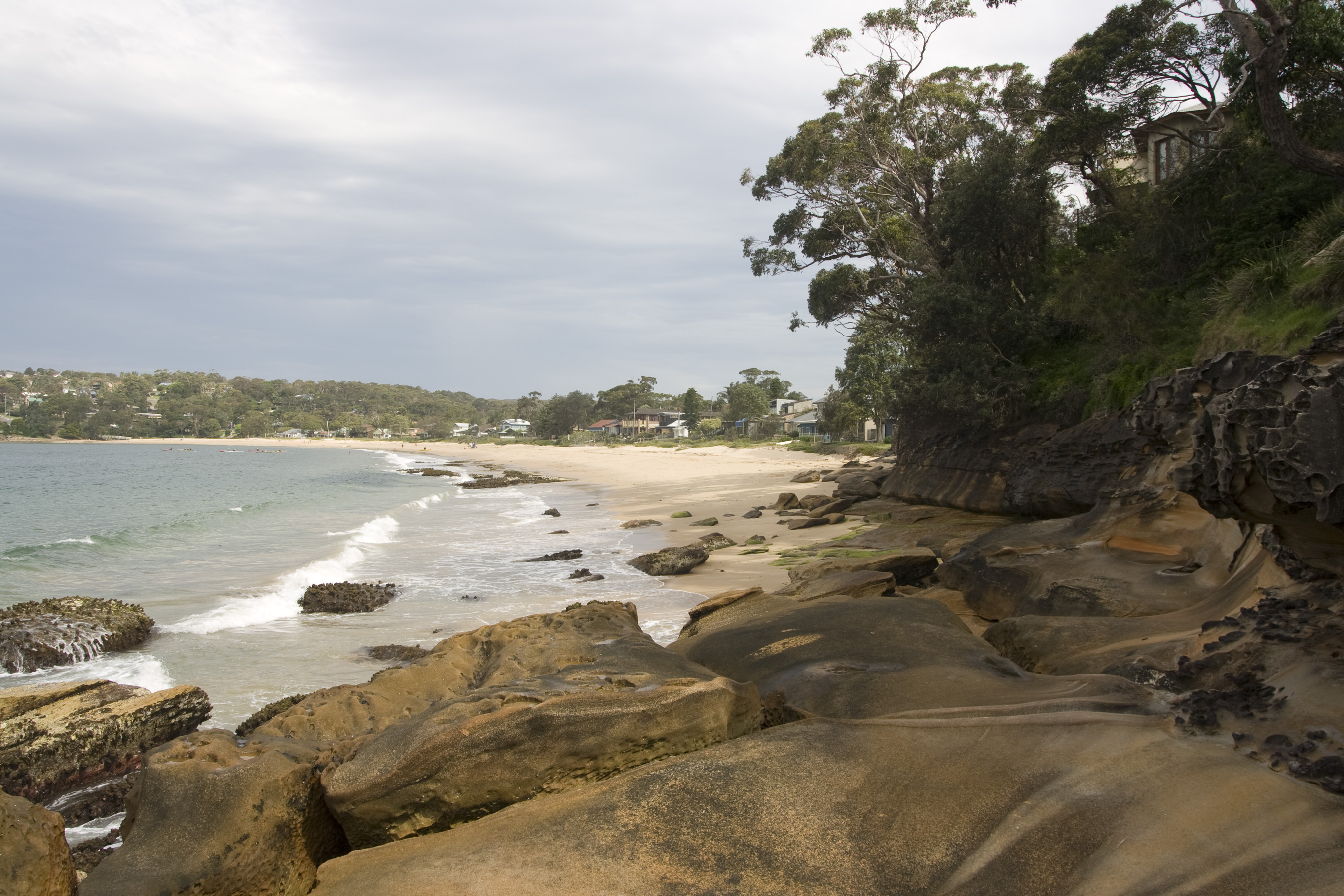
Bundeena NSW 2230, Australia – Panorama #44

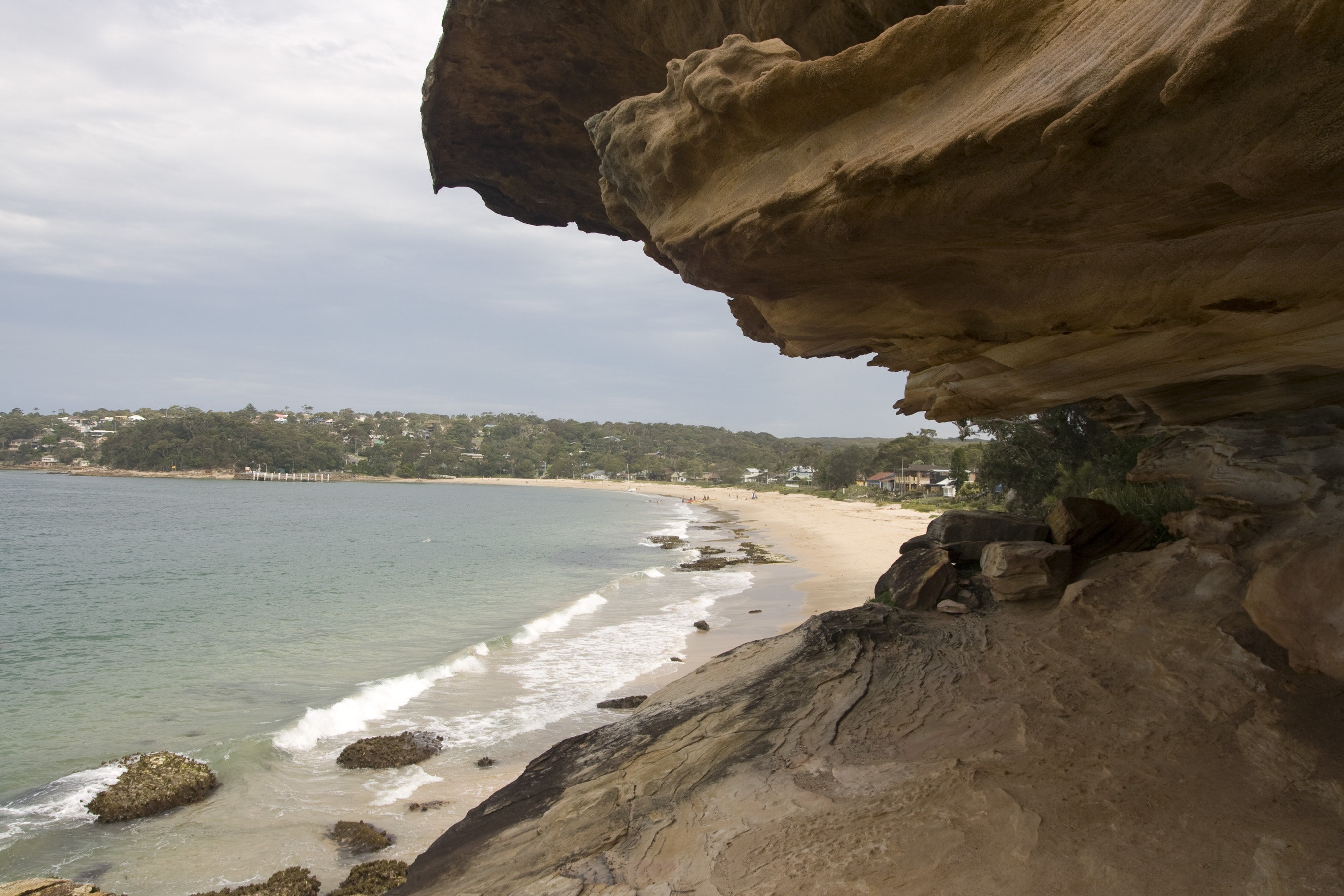
Bundeena NSW 2230, Australia – Panorama #45

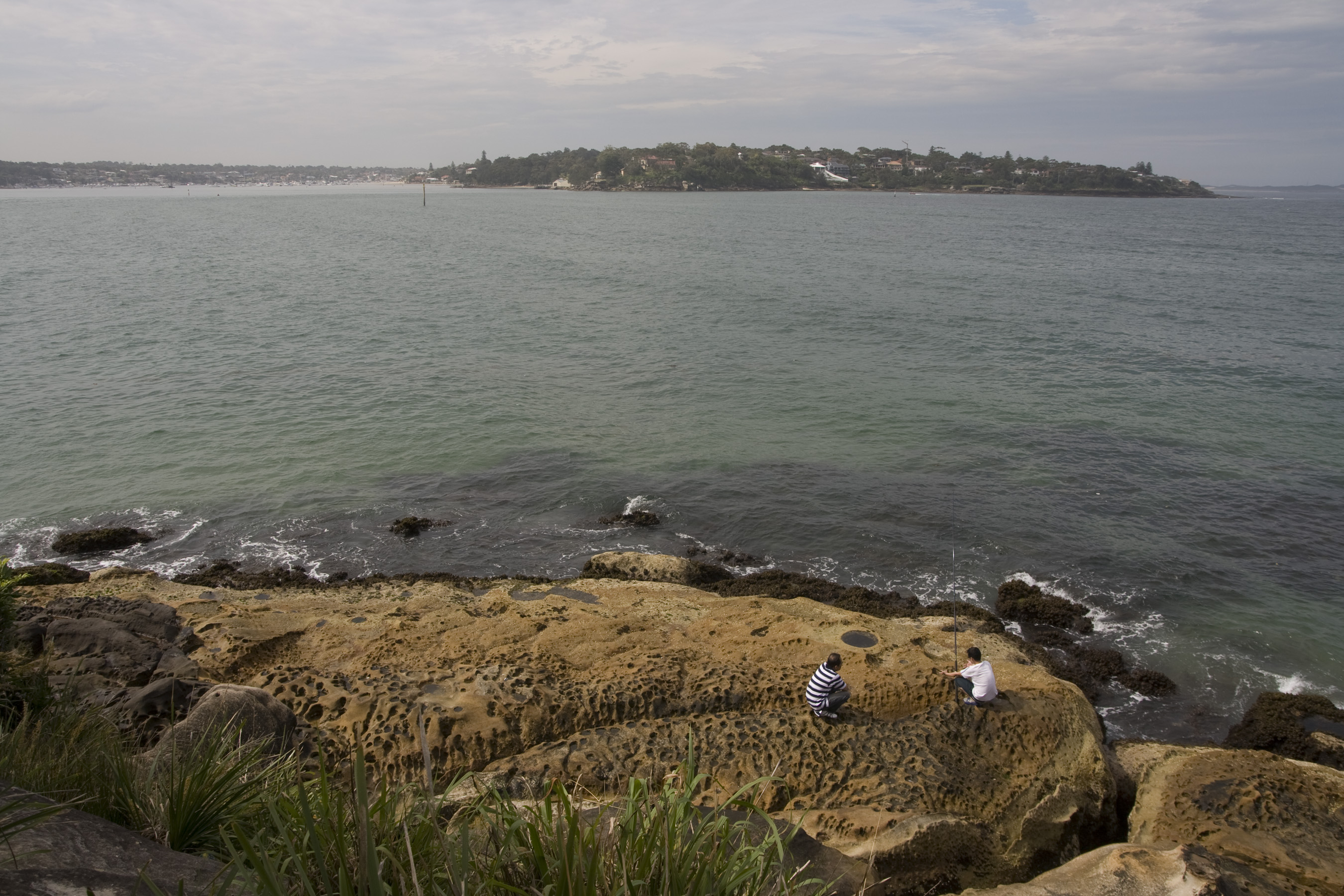
Bundeena NSW 2230, Australia – Panorama #46

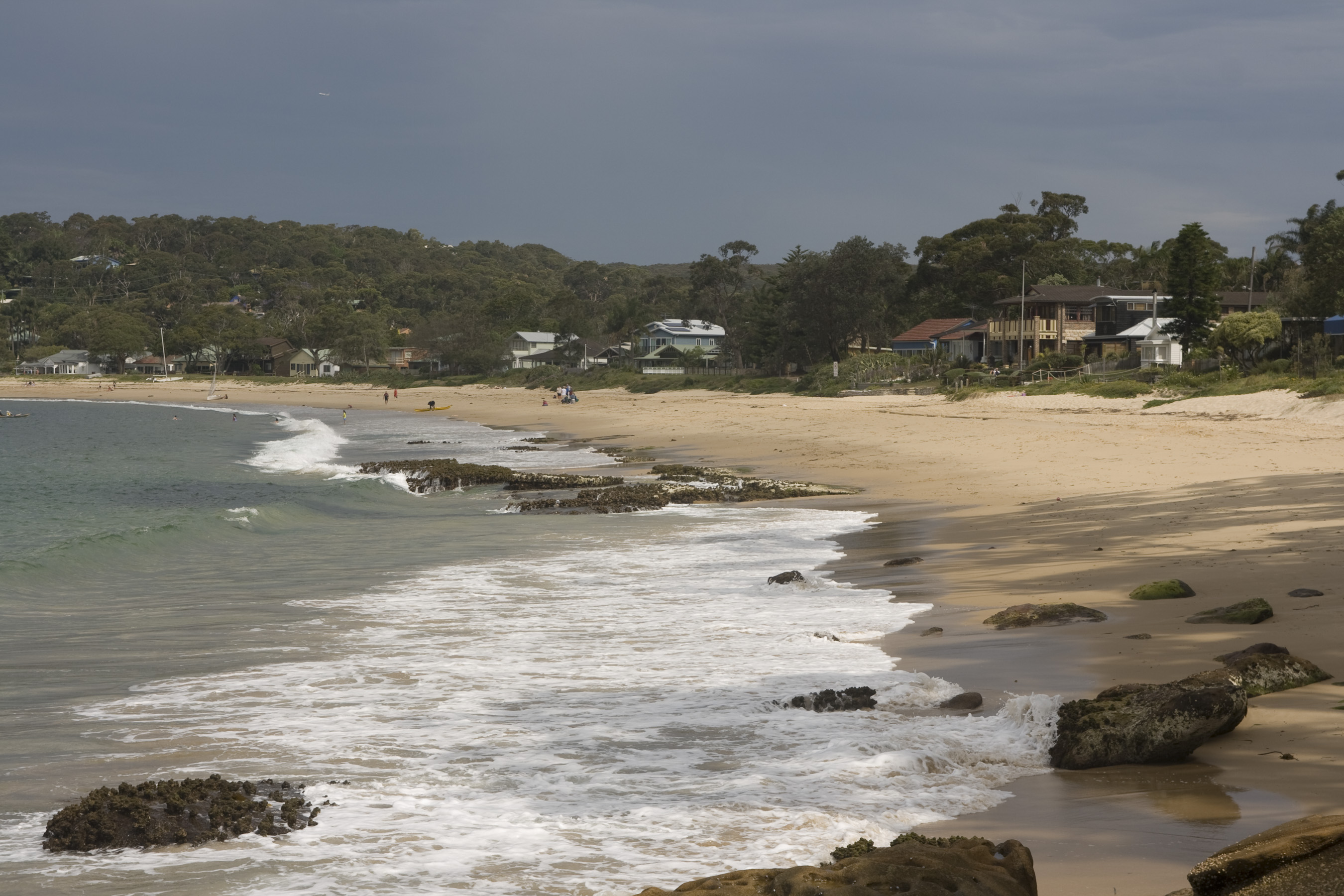
Bundeena NSW 2230, Australia – Panorama #47

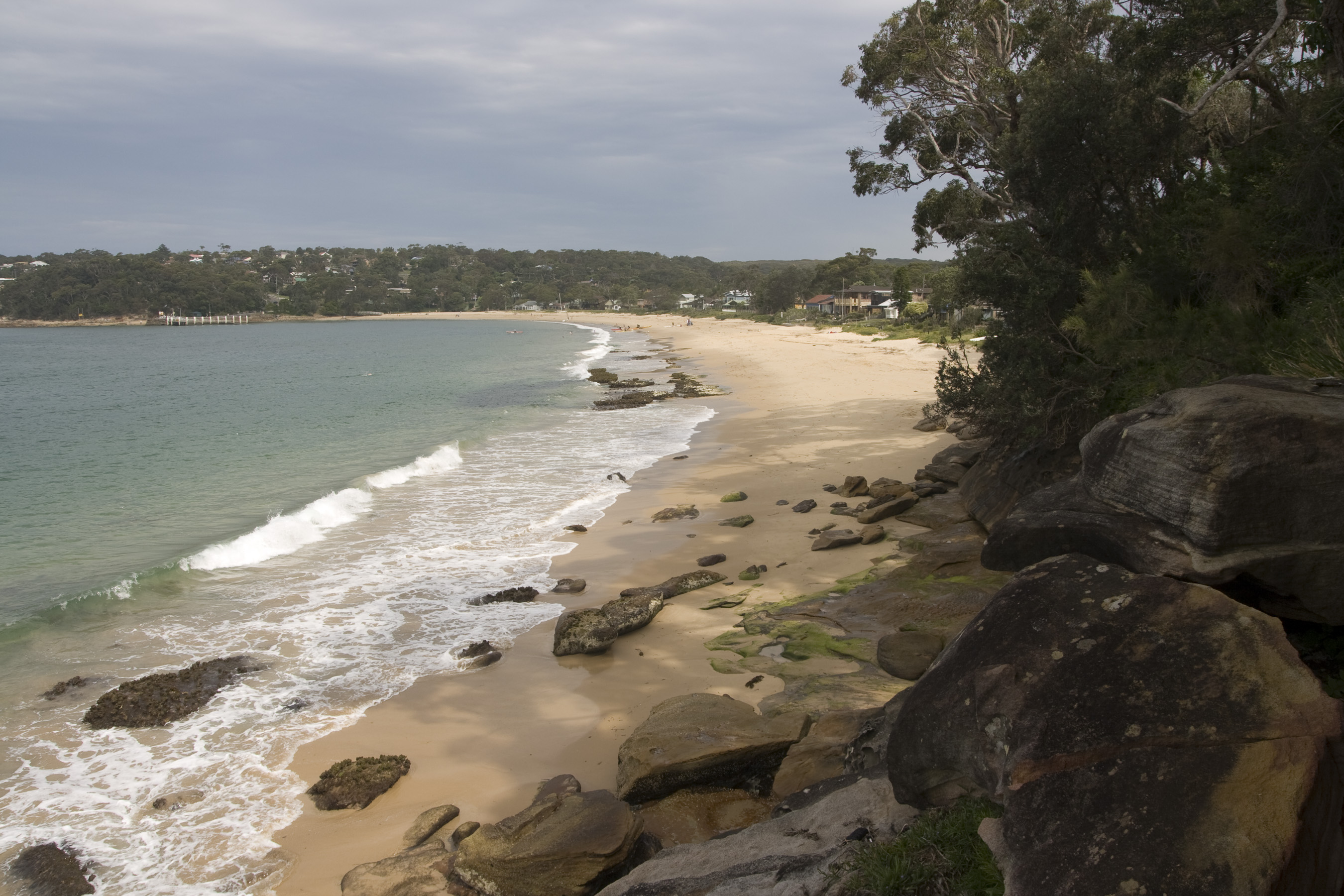
Bundeena NSW 2230, Australia – Panorama #48

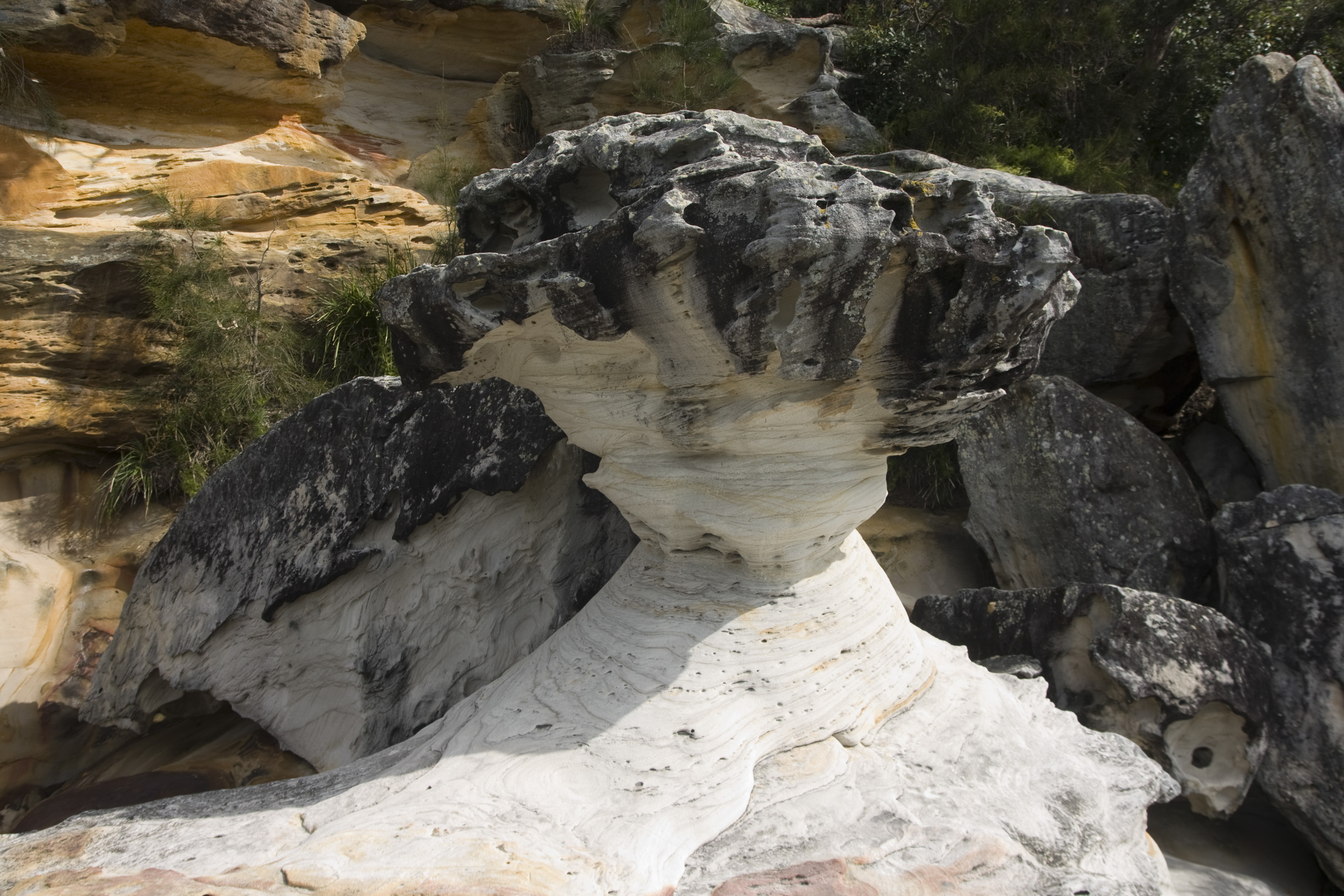
Bundeena NSW 2230, Australia – Panorama #49

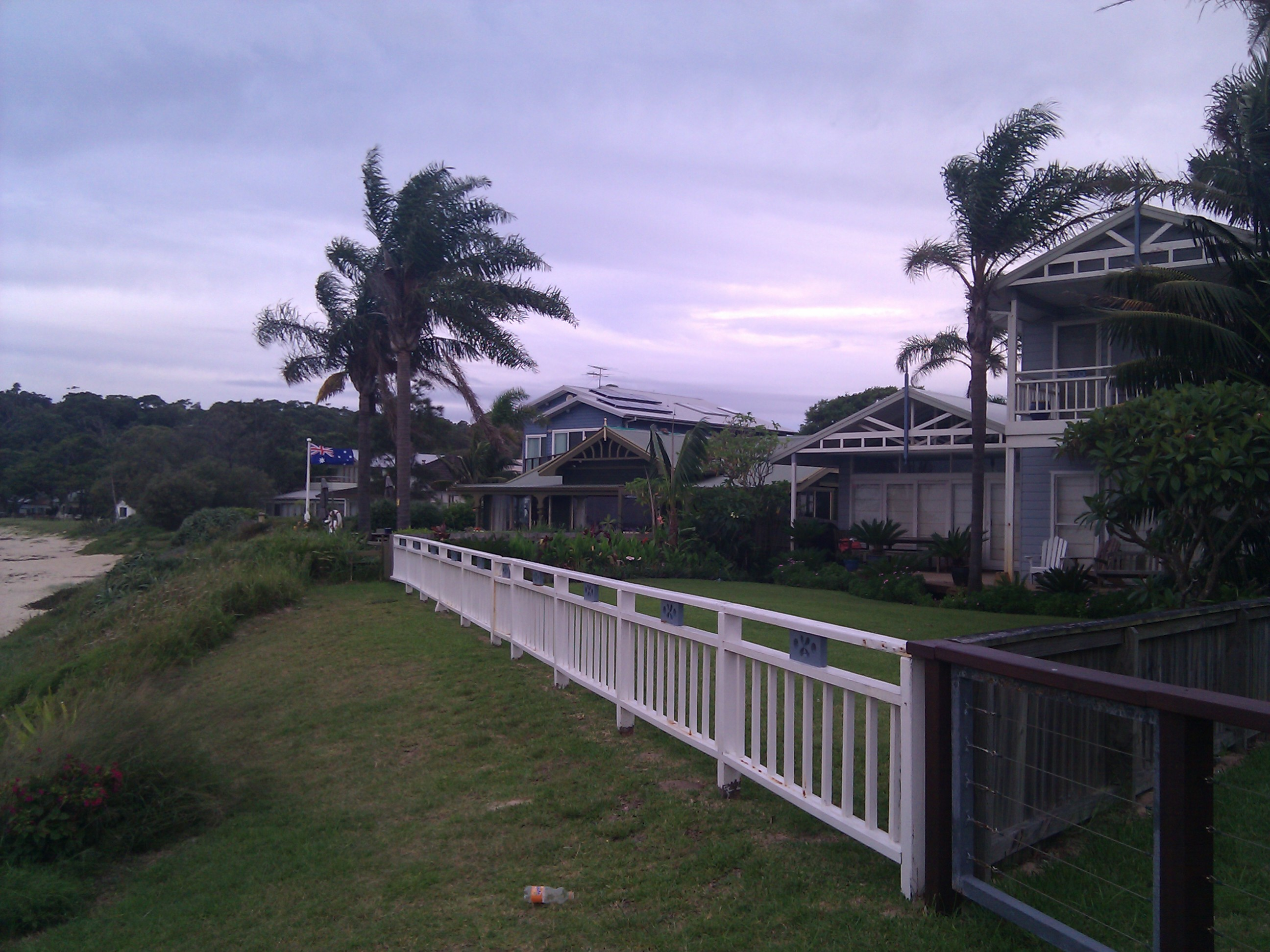
Bundeena NSW 2230, Australia – Panorama #50

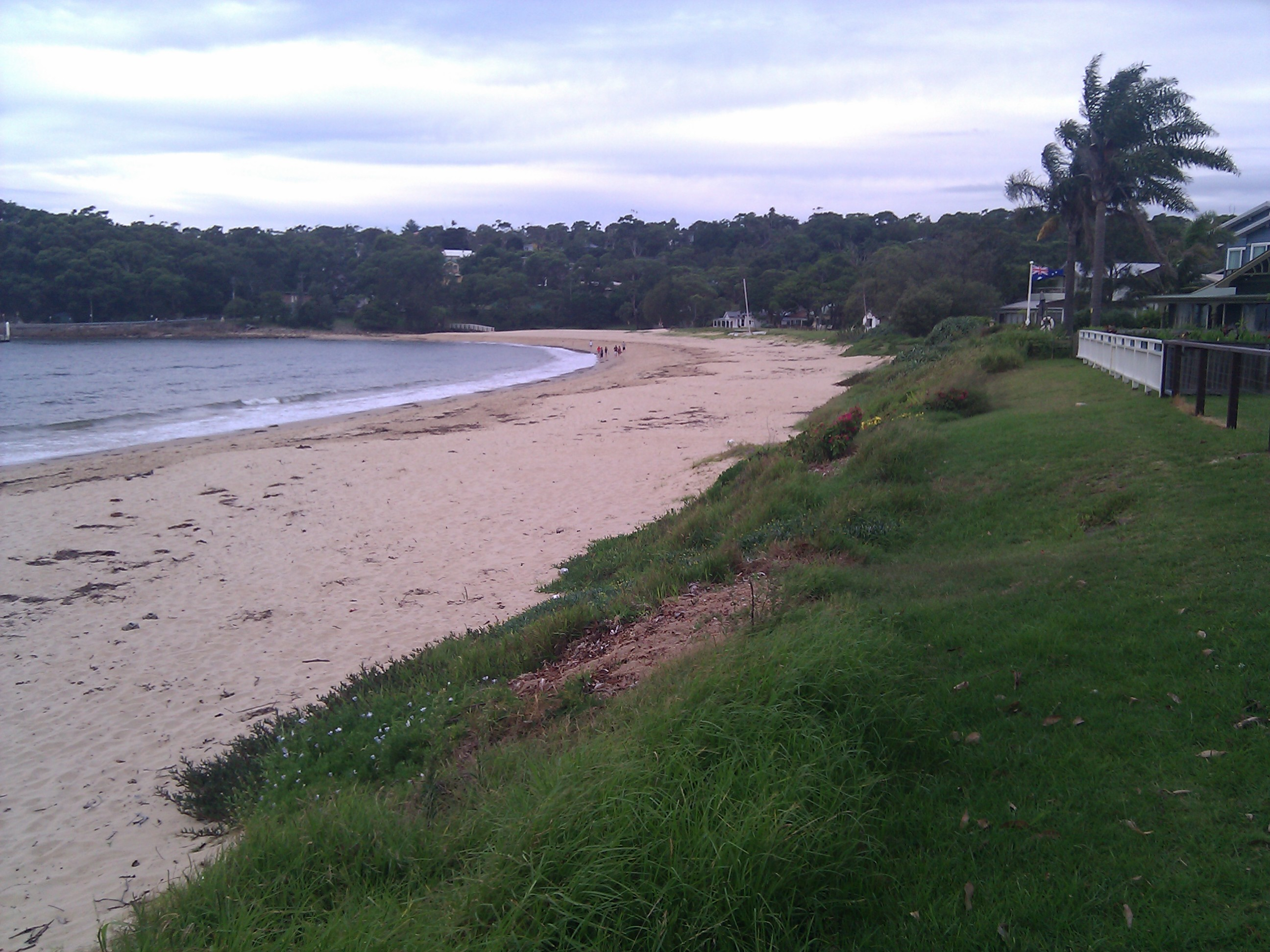
Bundeena NSW 2230, Australia – Panorama #51

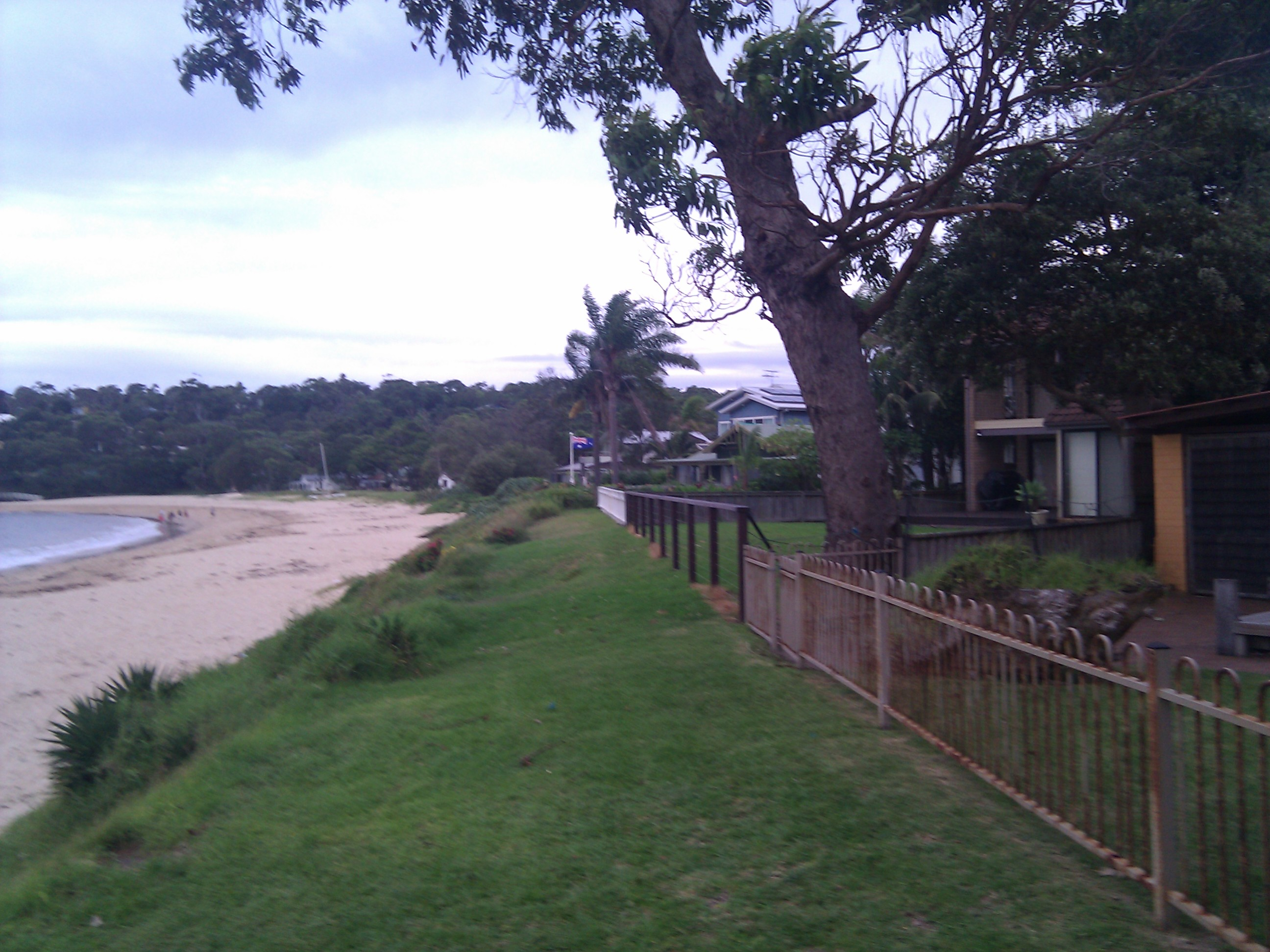
Bundeena NSW 2230, Australia – Panorama #52

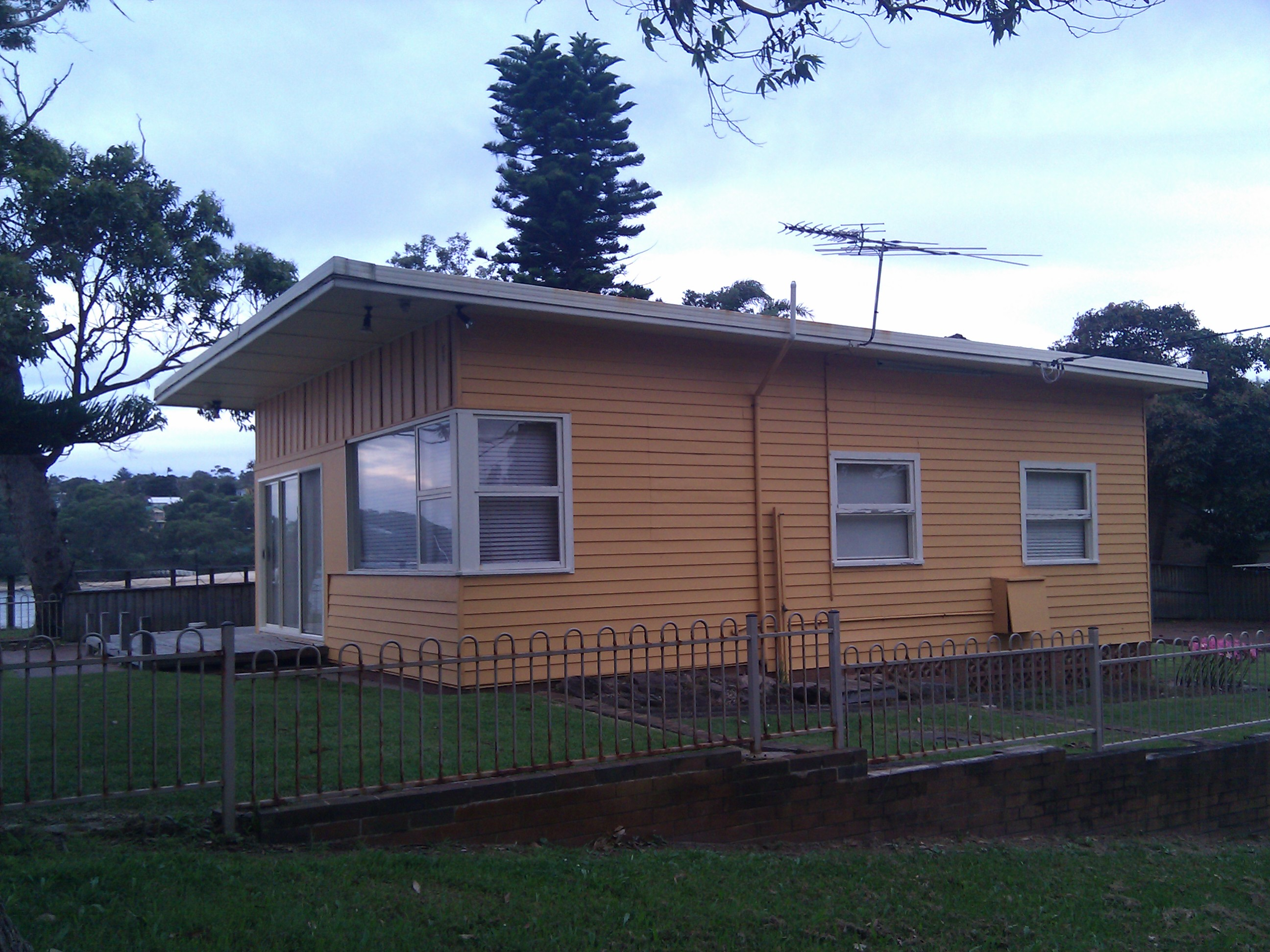
Bundeena NSW 2230, Australia – Panorama #53

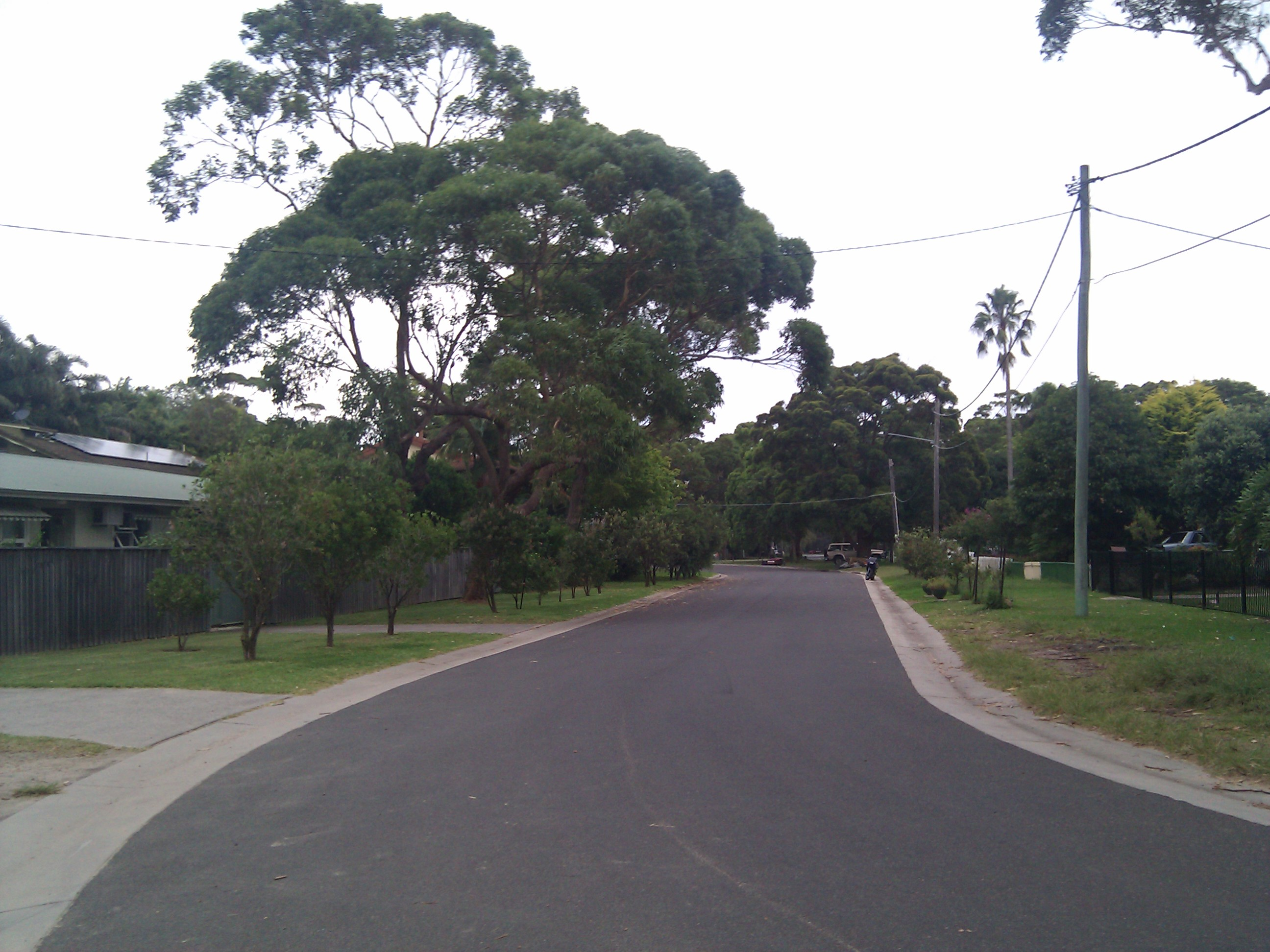
Liverpool Street, Bundeena

Bundeena NSW 2230, Australia – Panorama #54

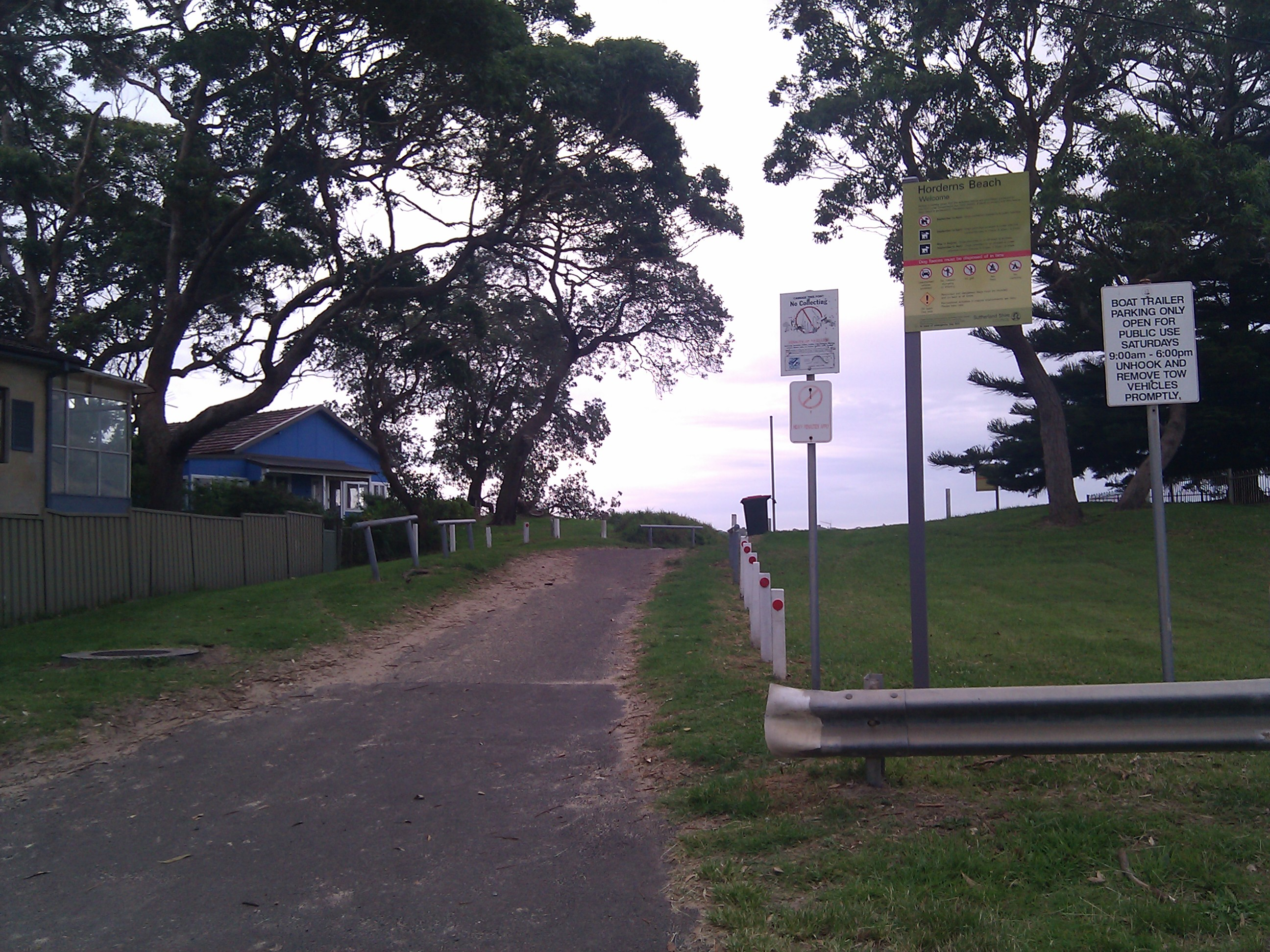
Bundeena NSW 2230, Australia – Panorama #55

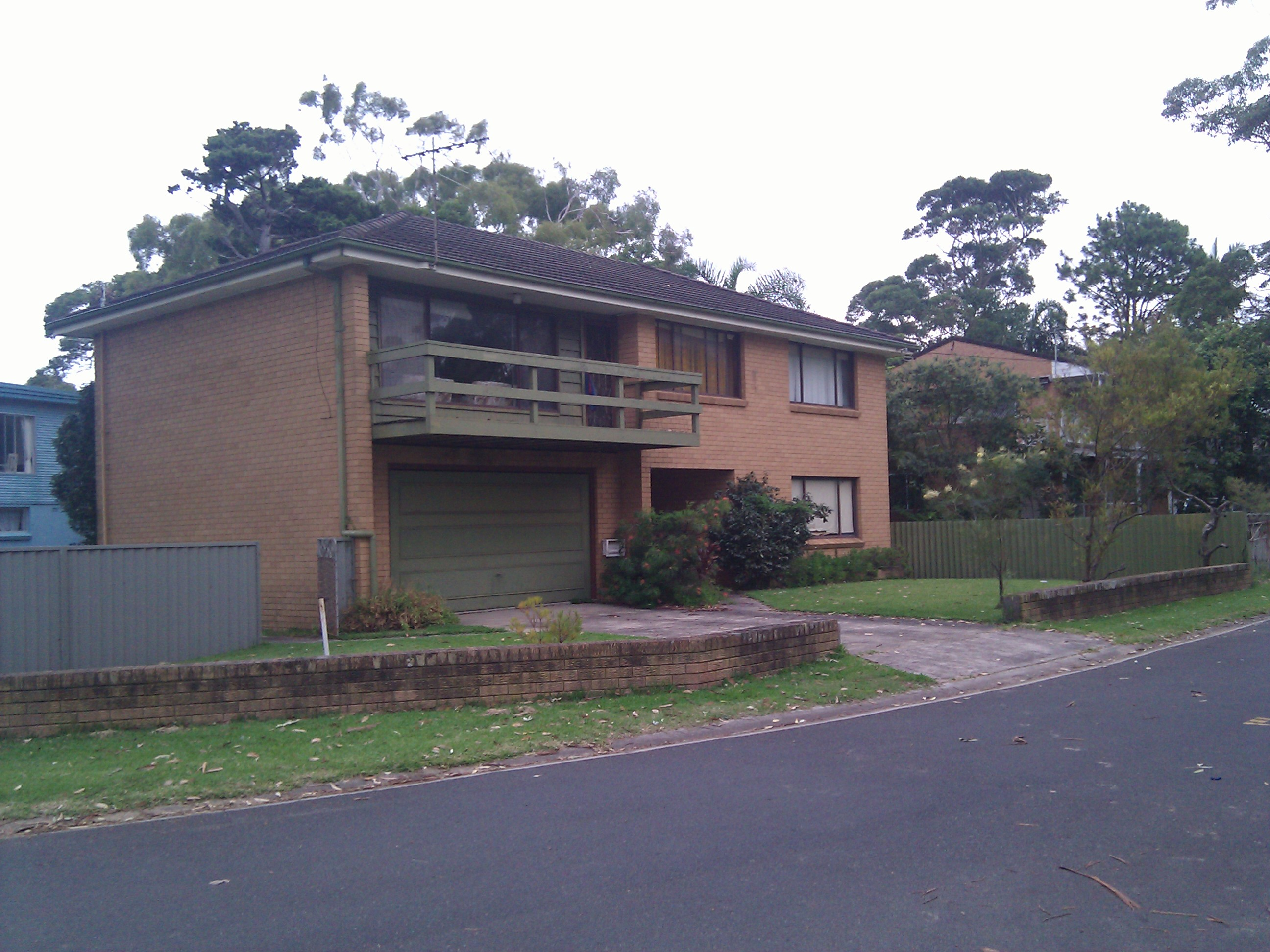
Bundeena NSW 2230, Australia – Panorama #56

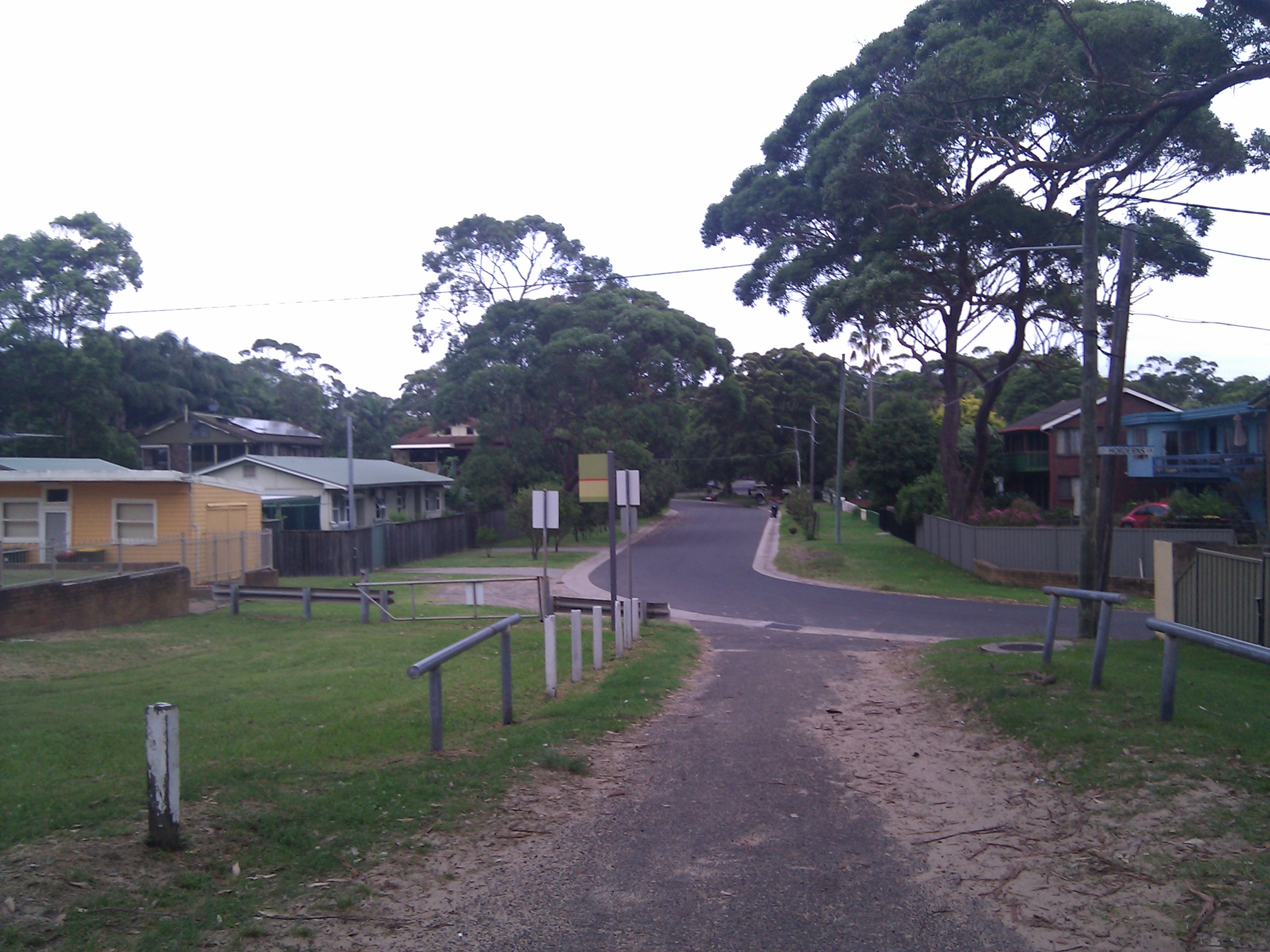
Bundeena NSW 2230, Australia – Panorama #57

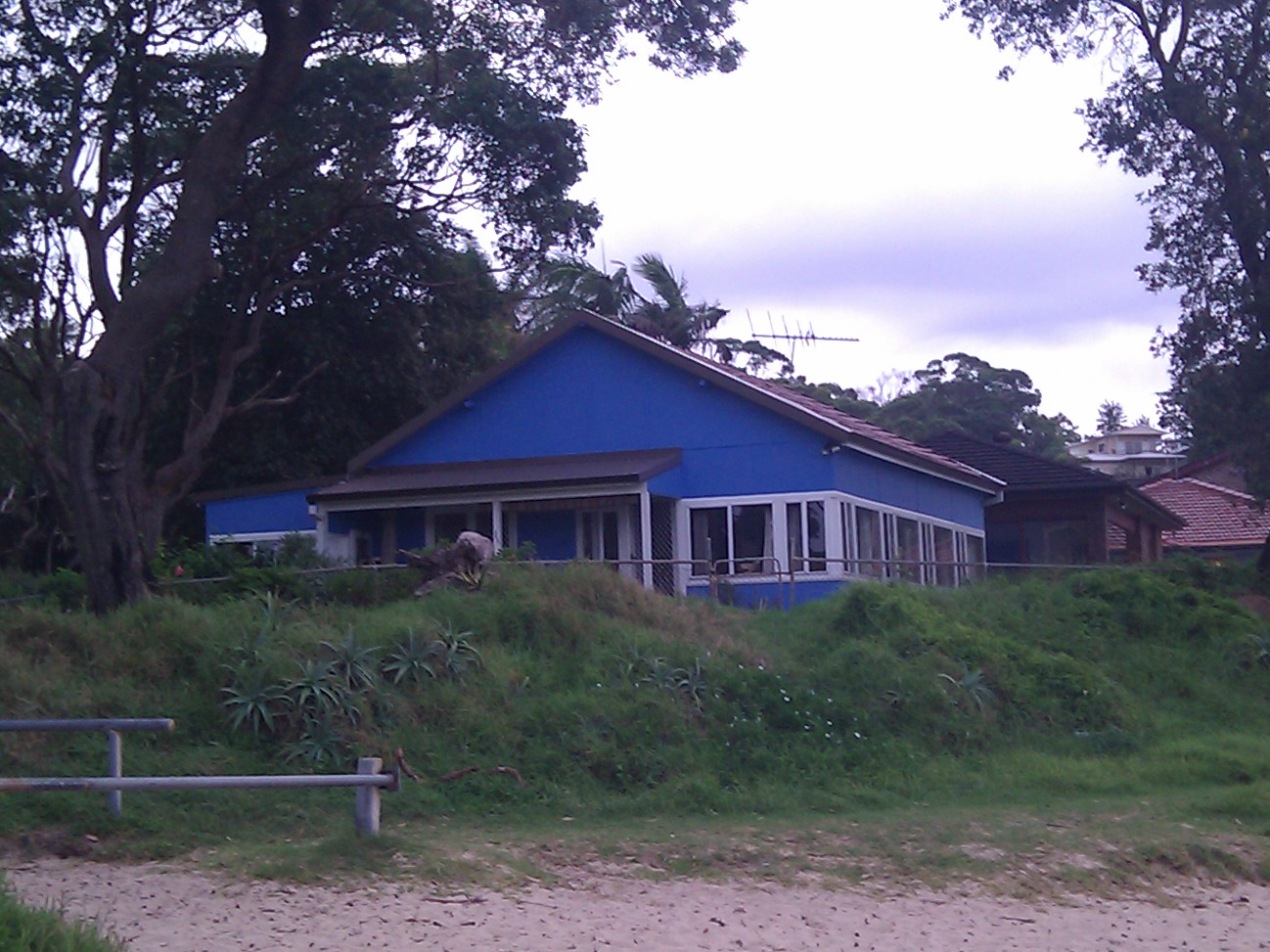
Bundeena NSW 2230, Australia – Panorama #58

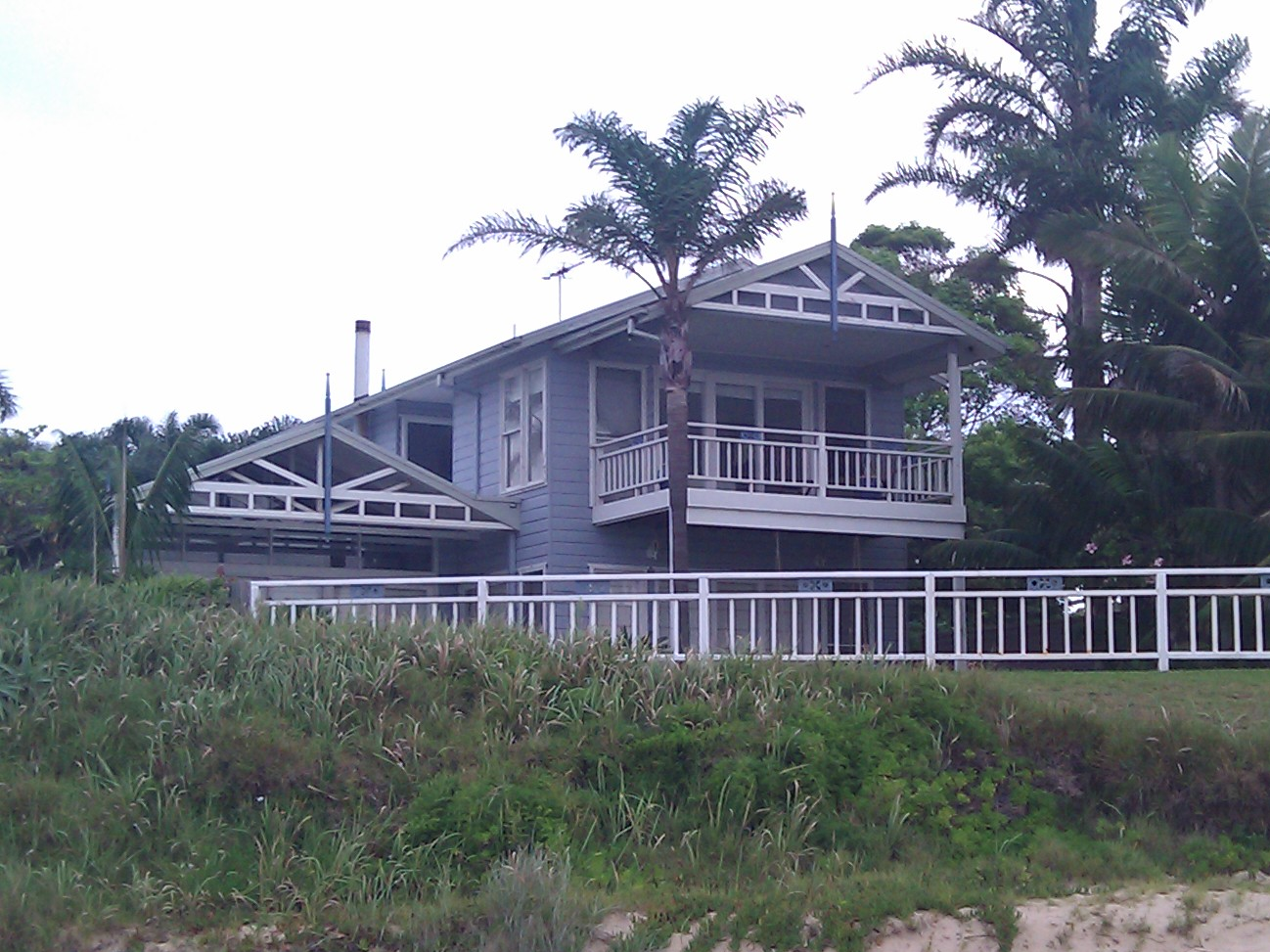
Bundeena NSW 2230, Australia – Panorama #59

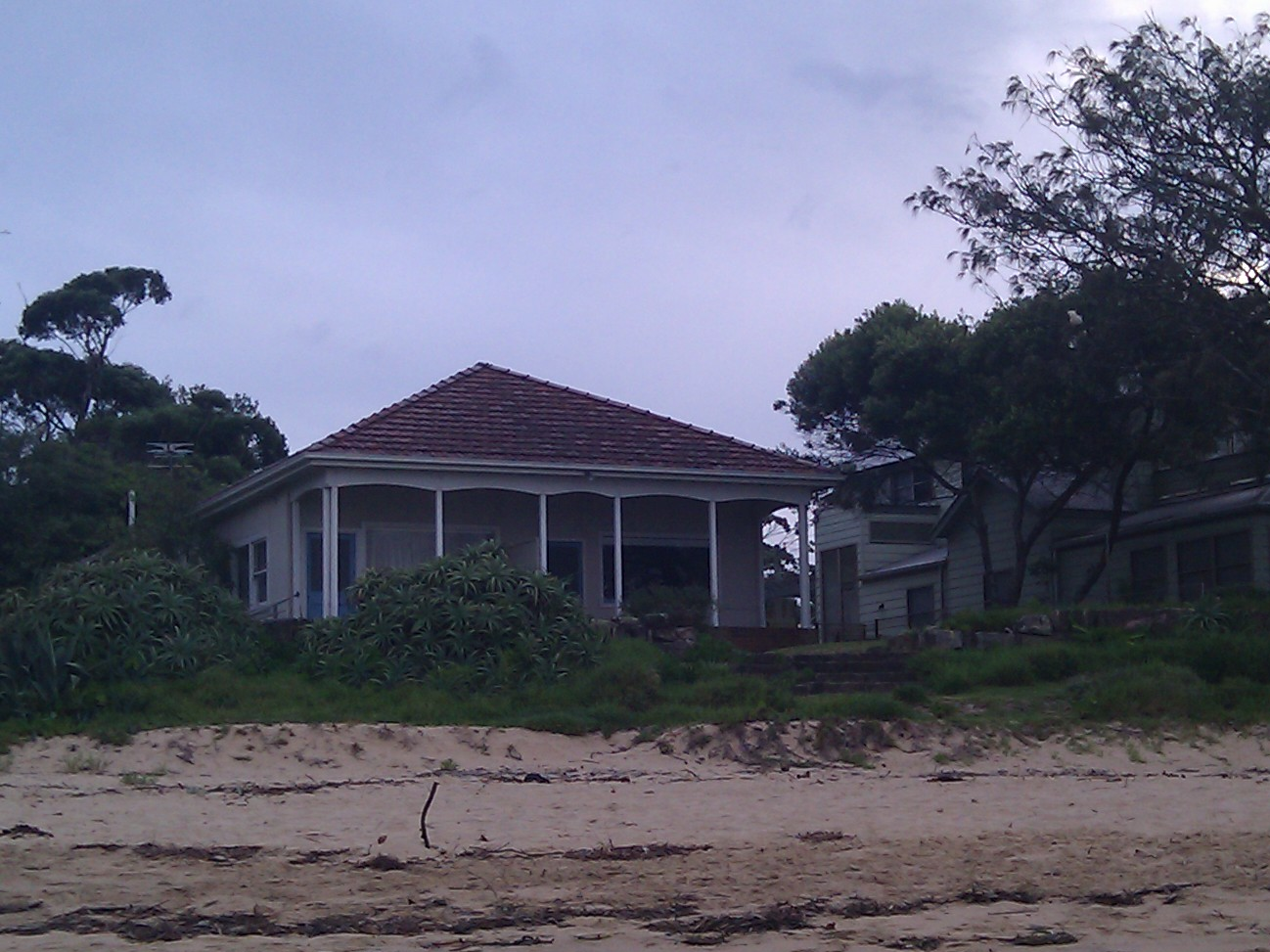
Bundeena NSW 2230, Australia – Panorama #60

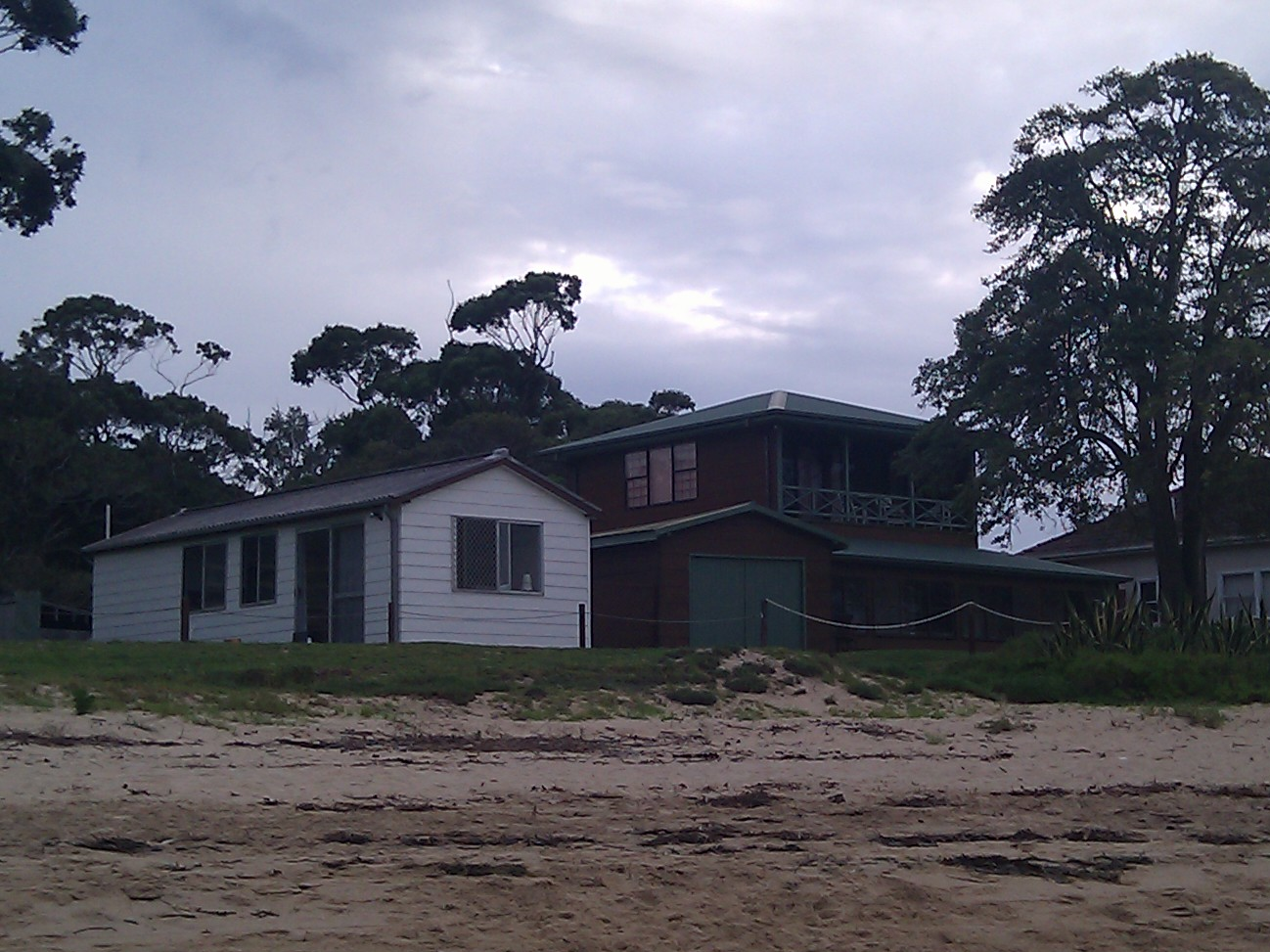
Bundeena NSW 2230, Australia – Panorama #61

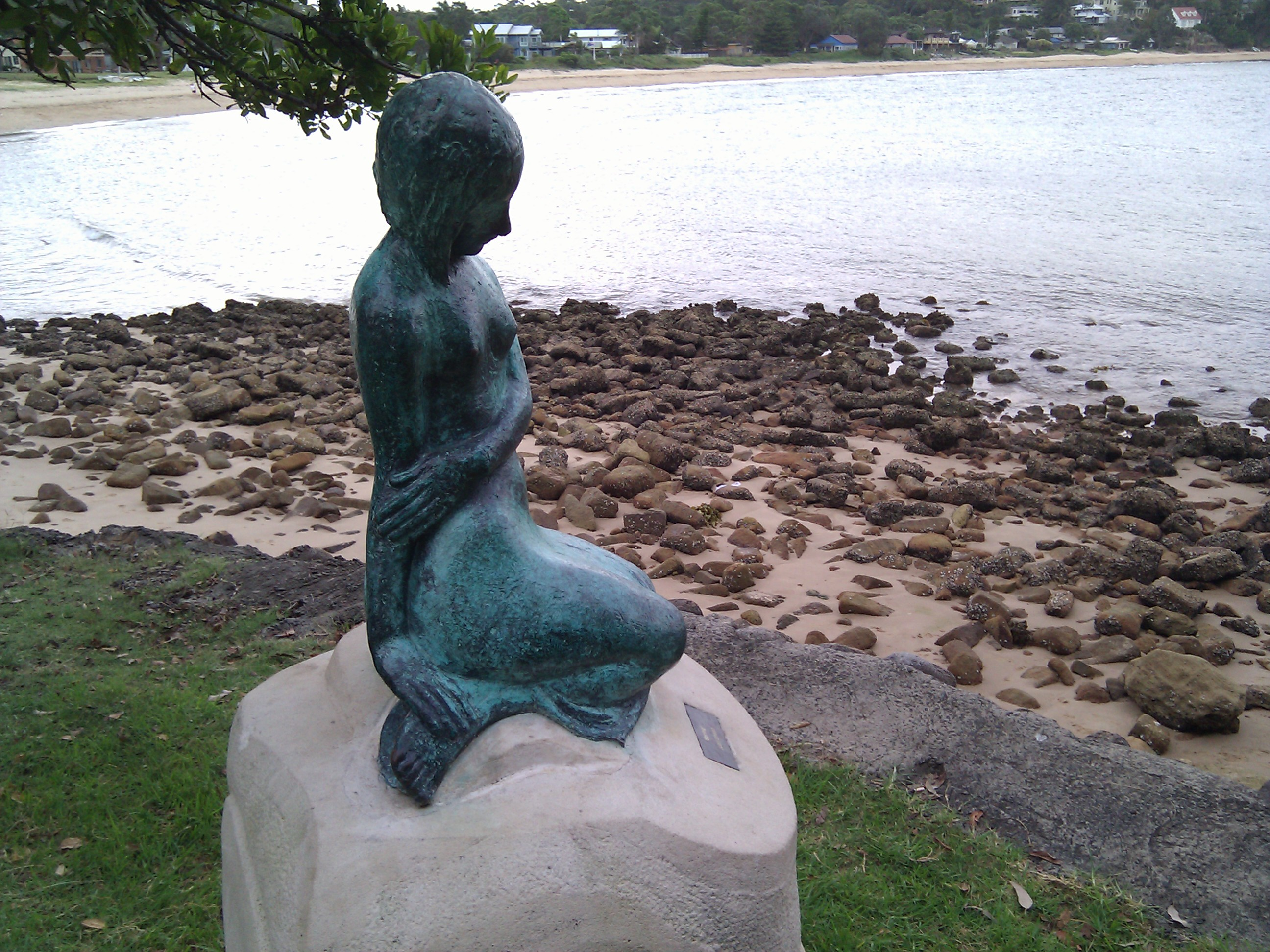
Bundeena NSW 2230, Australia – Panorama #62

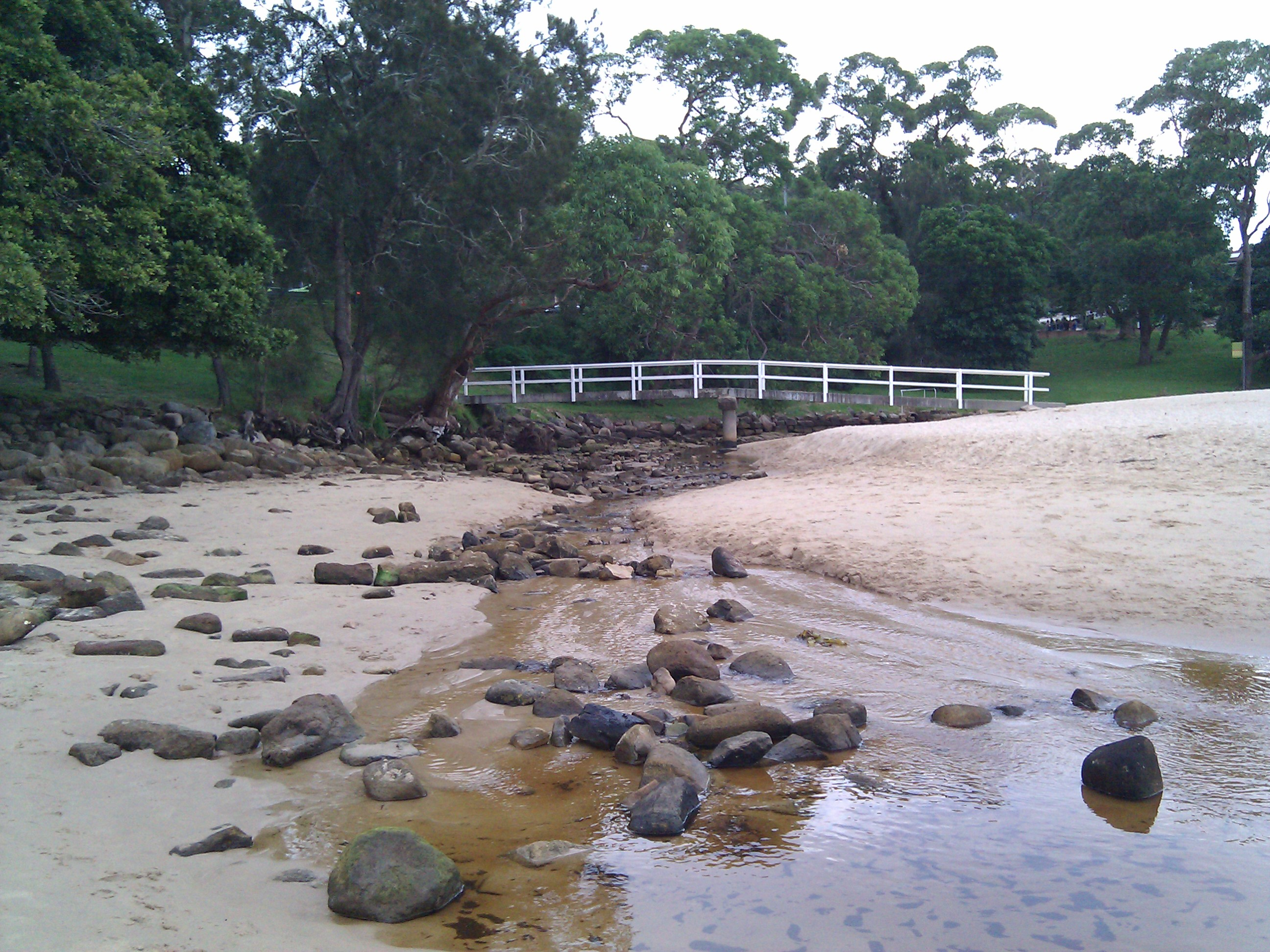
Bundeena NSW 2230, Australia – Panorama #63

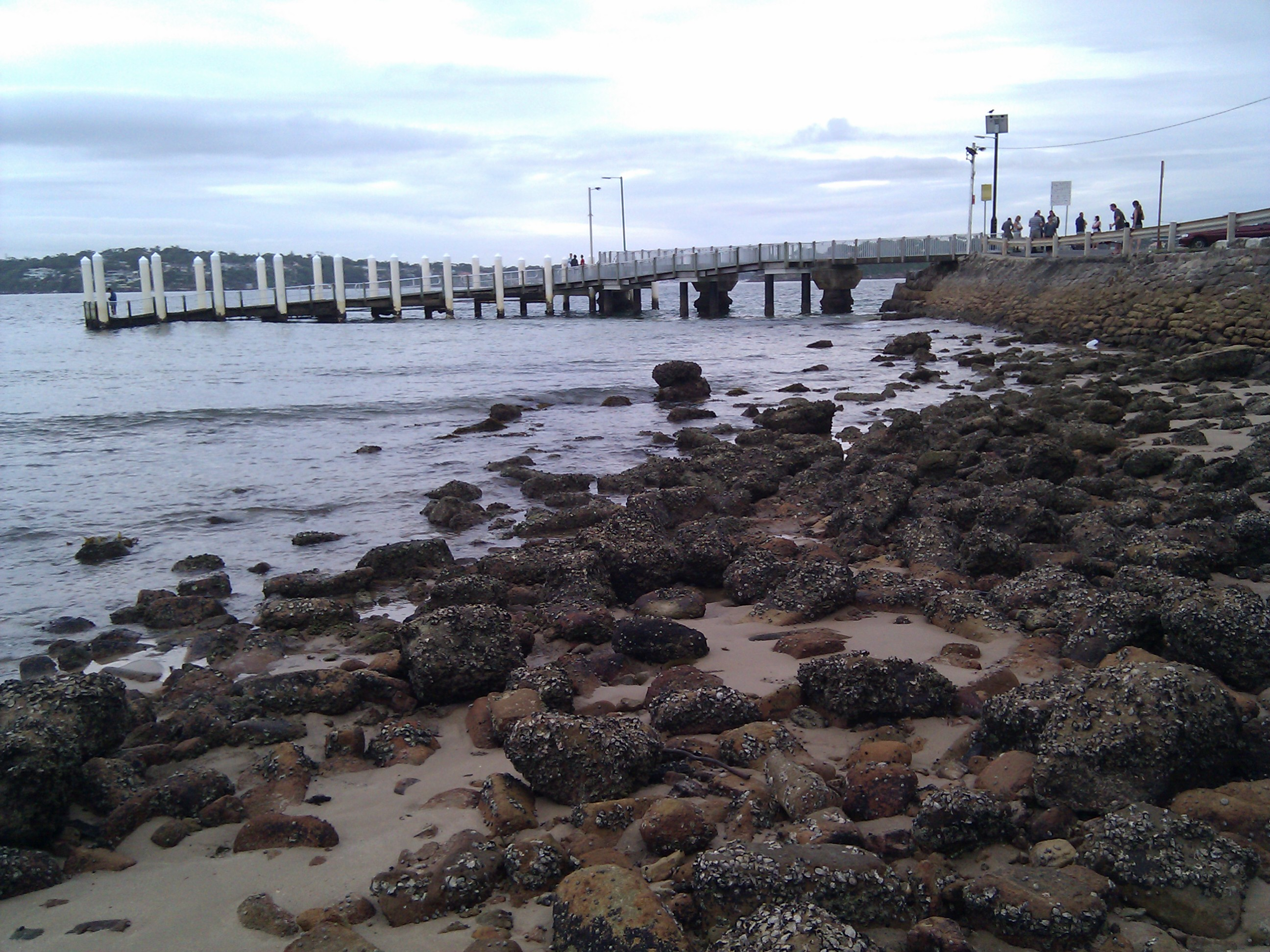
Bundeena NSW 2230, Australia – Panorama #64

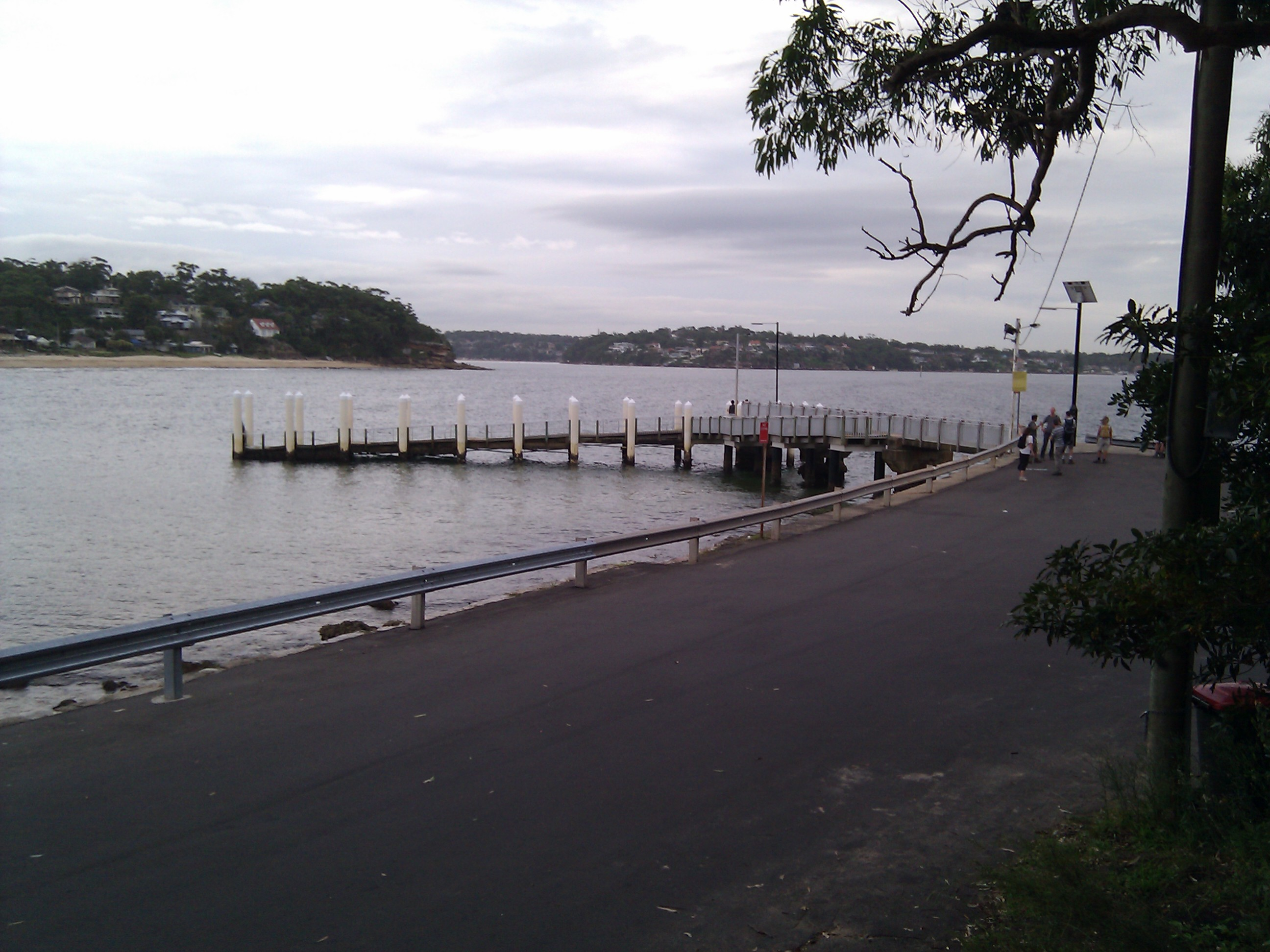
Bundeena NSW 2230, Australia – Panorama #65

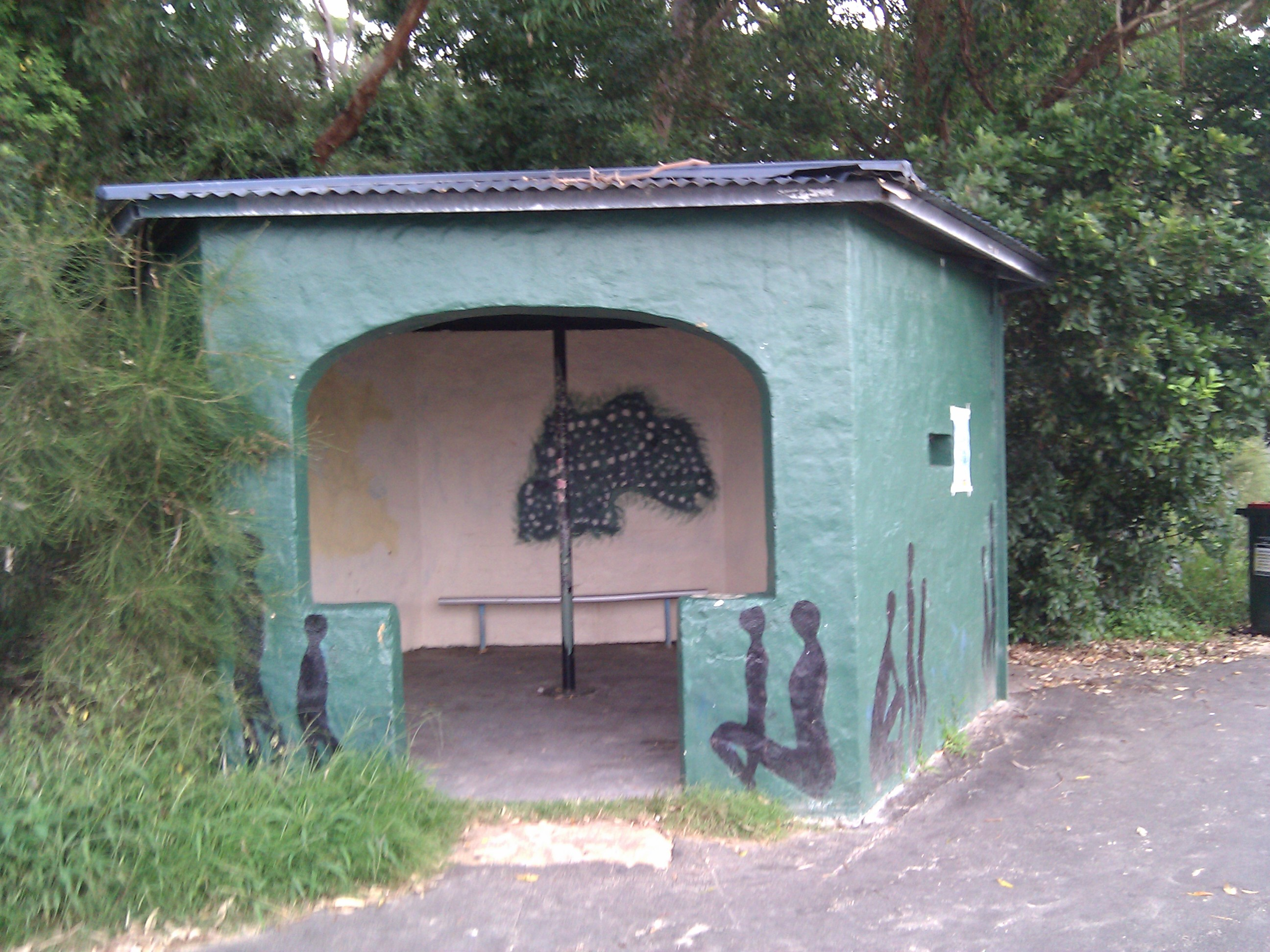
Bundeena NSW 2230, Australia – Panorama #66

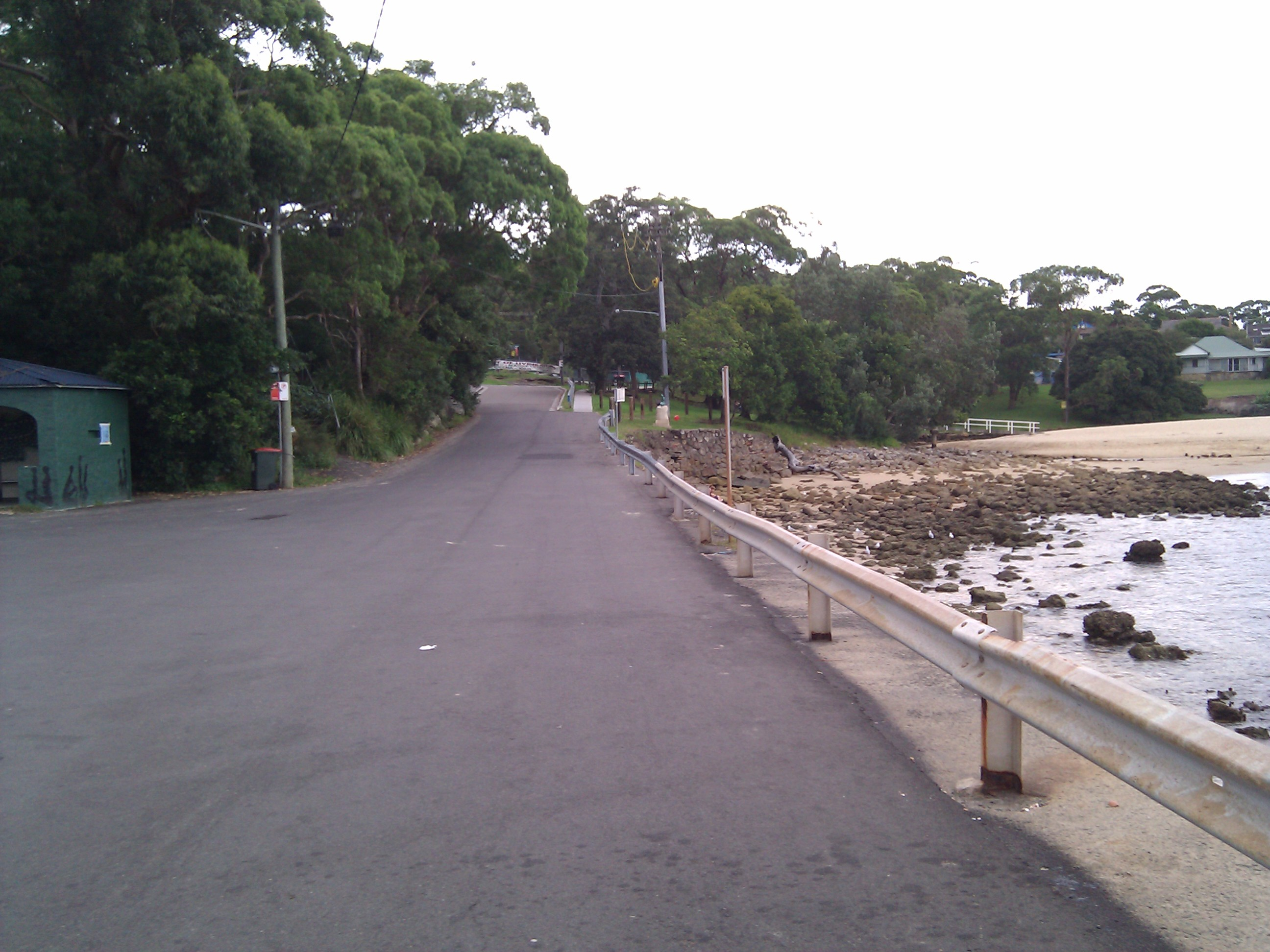
Brighton Street, Bundeena

Bundeena NSW 2230, Australia – Panorama #67

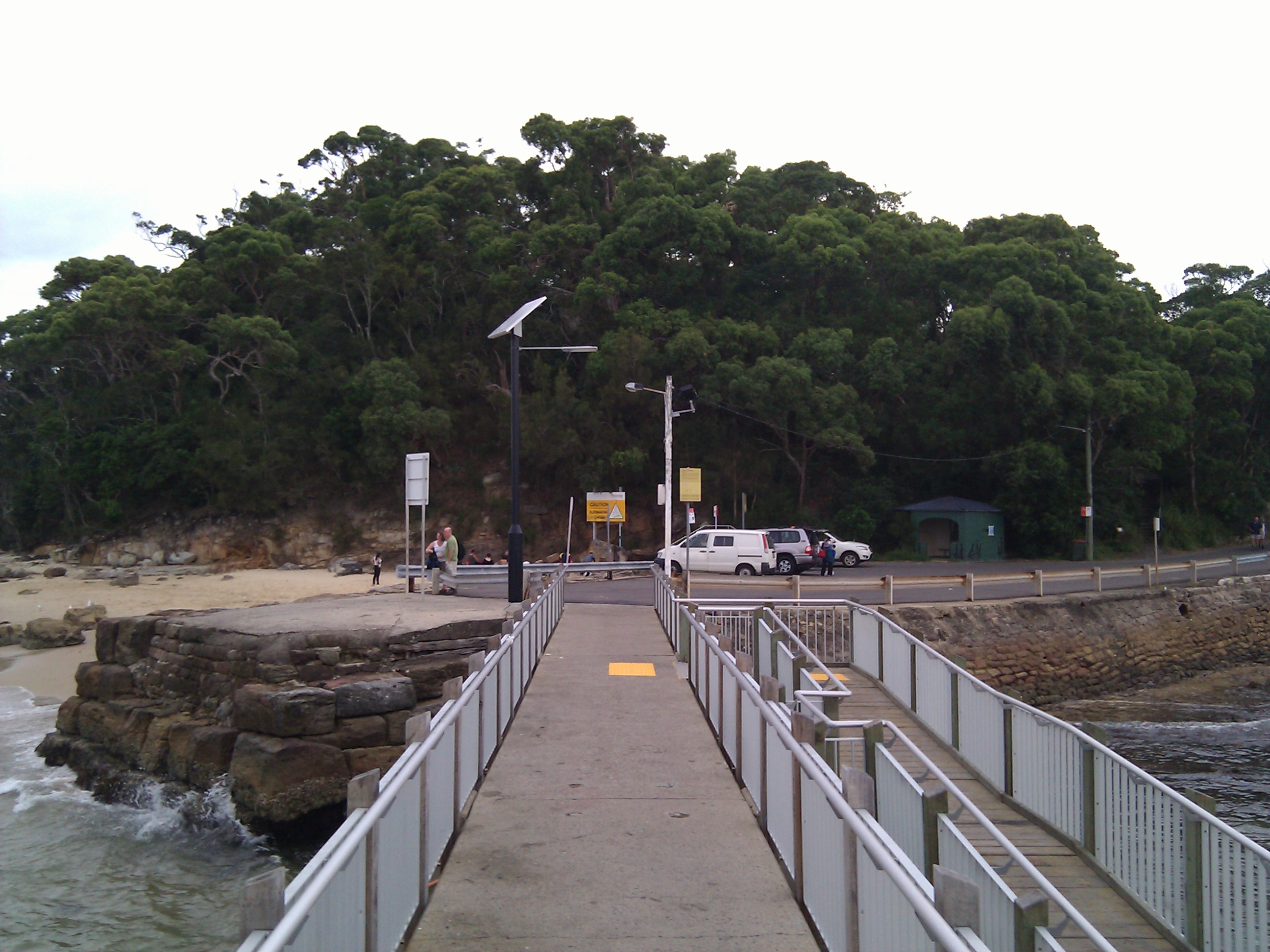
Bundeena NSW 2230, Australia – Panorama #68

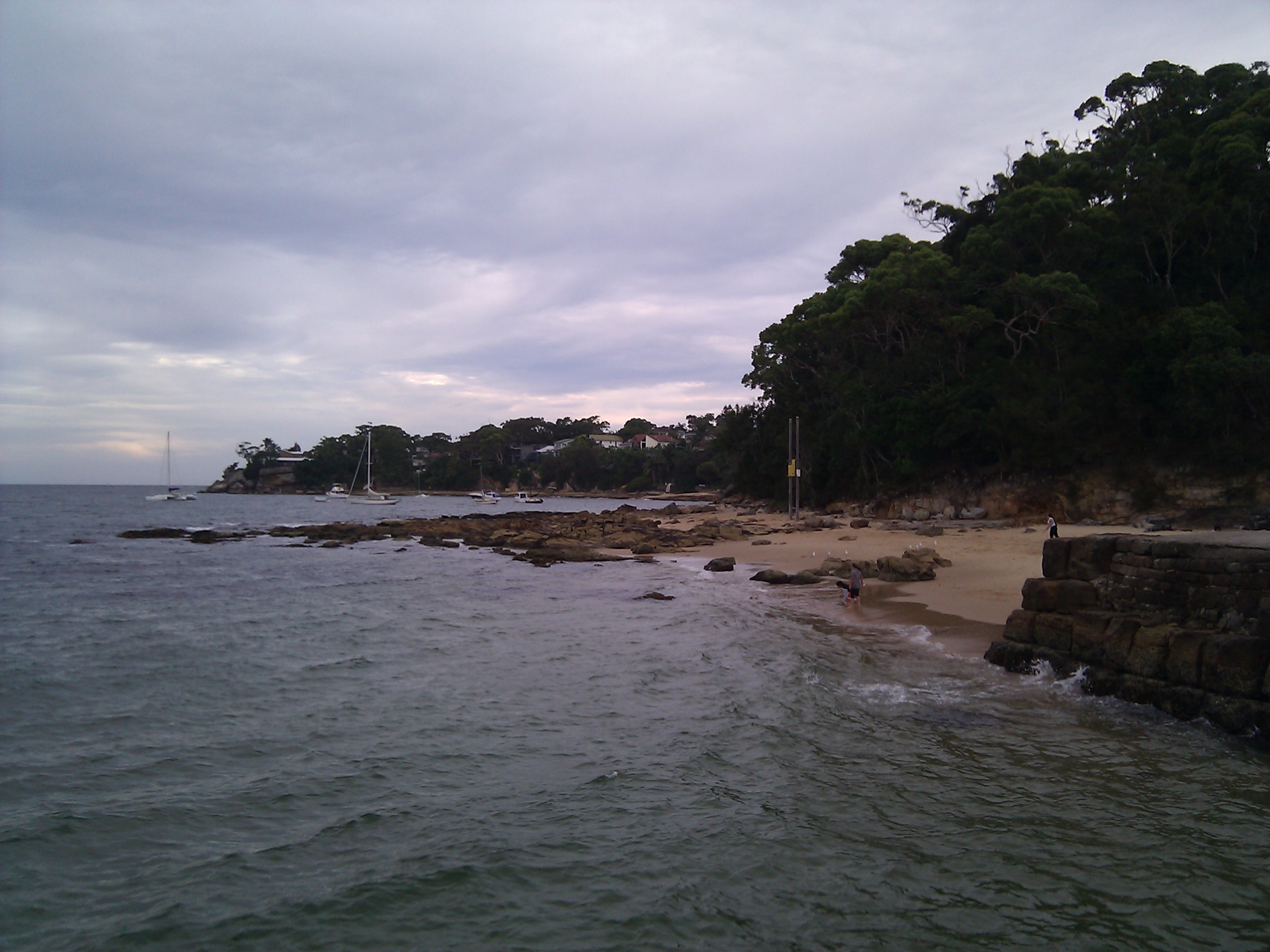
Bundeena NSW 2230, Australia – Panorama #69

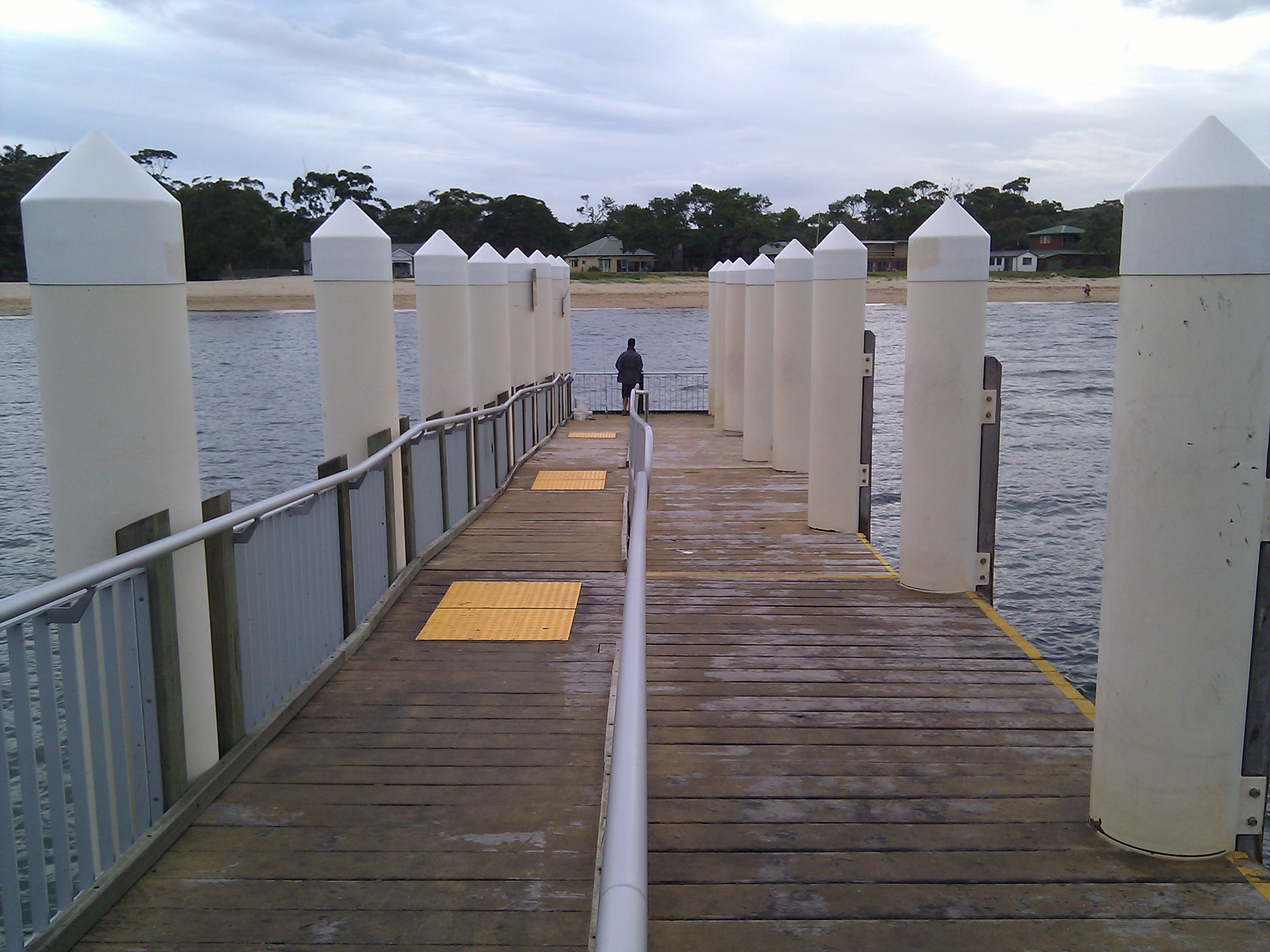
Bundeena NSW 2230, Australia – Panorama #70

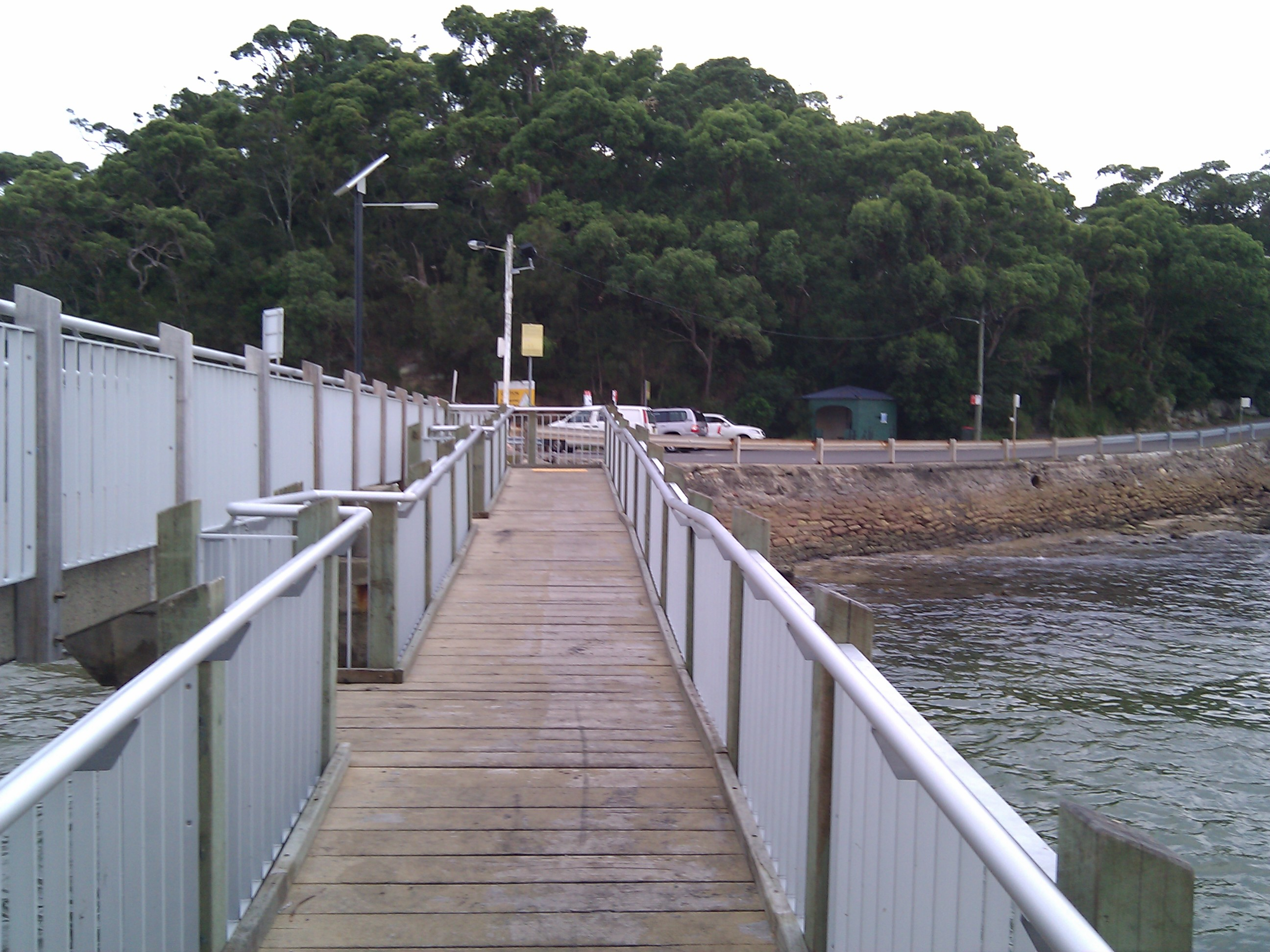
Bundeena NSW 2230, Australia – Panorama #71

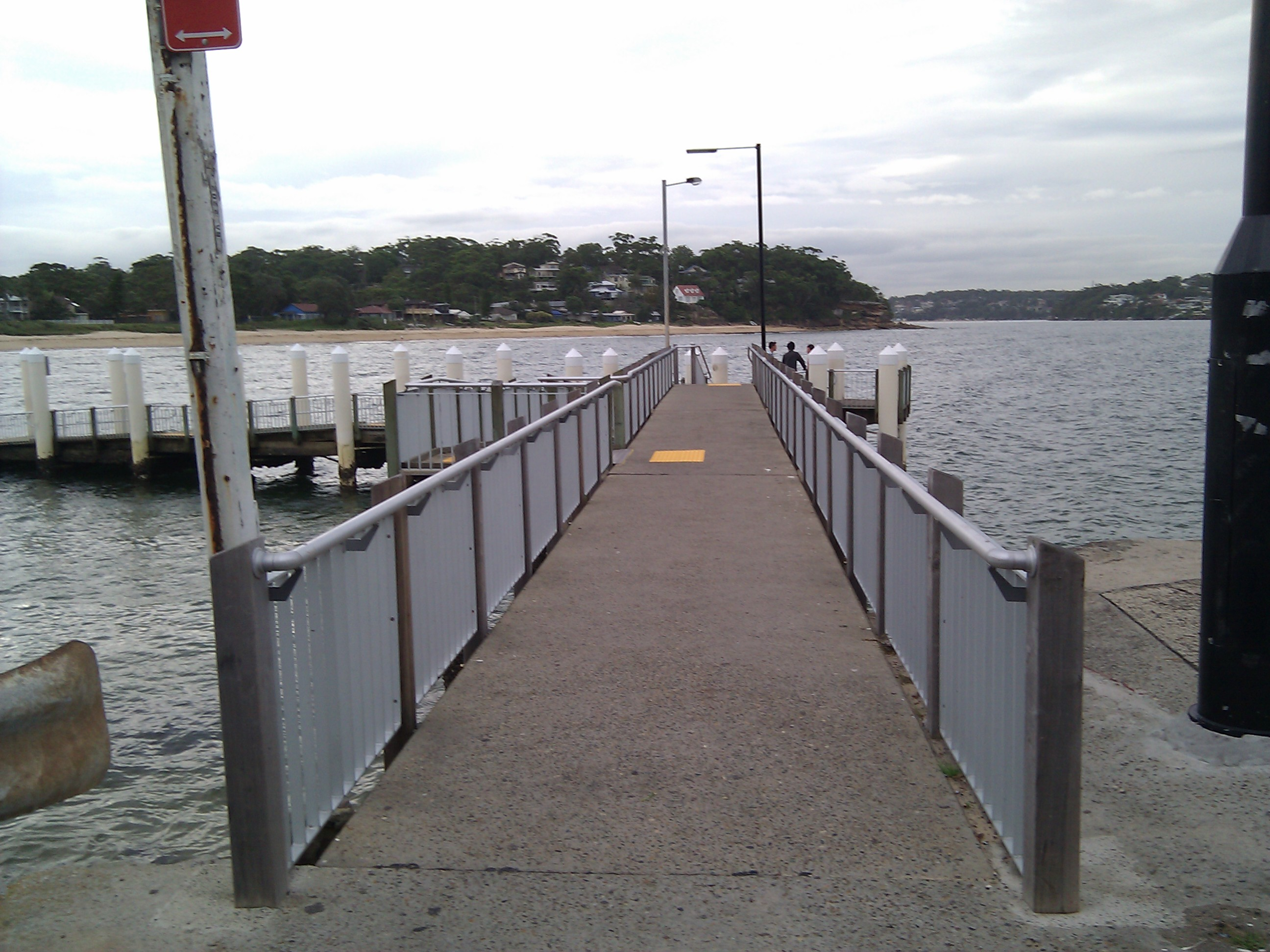
Bundeena NSW 2230, Australia – Panorama #72

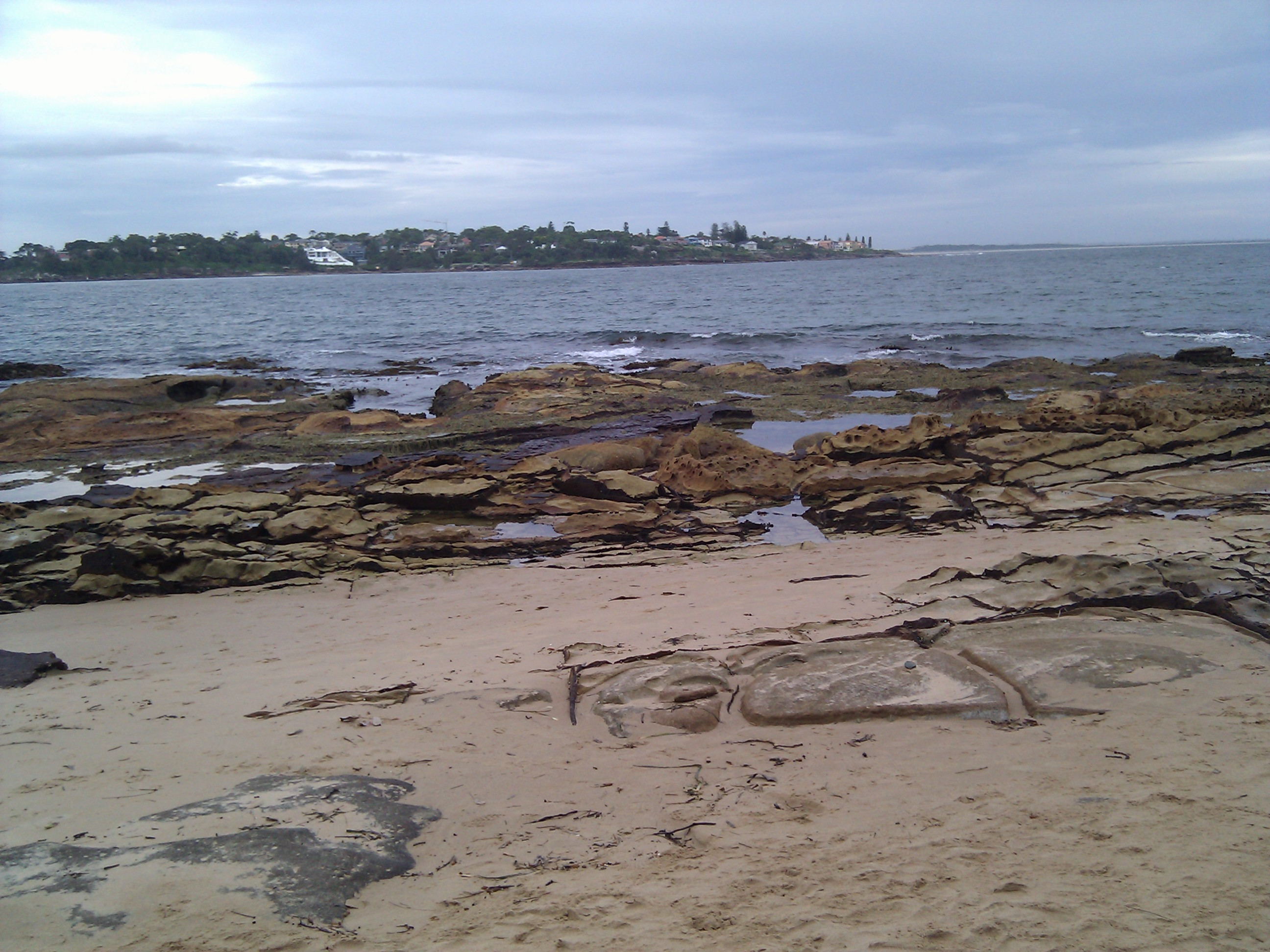
Bundeena NSW 2230, Australia – Panorama #73

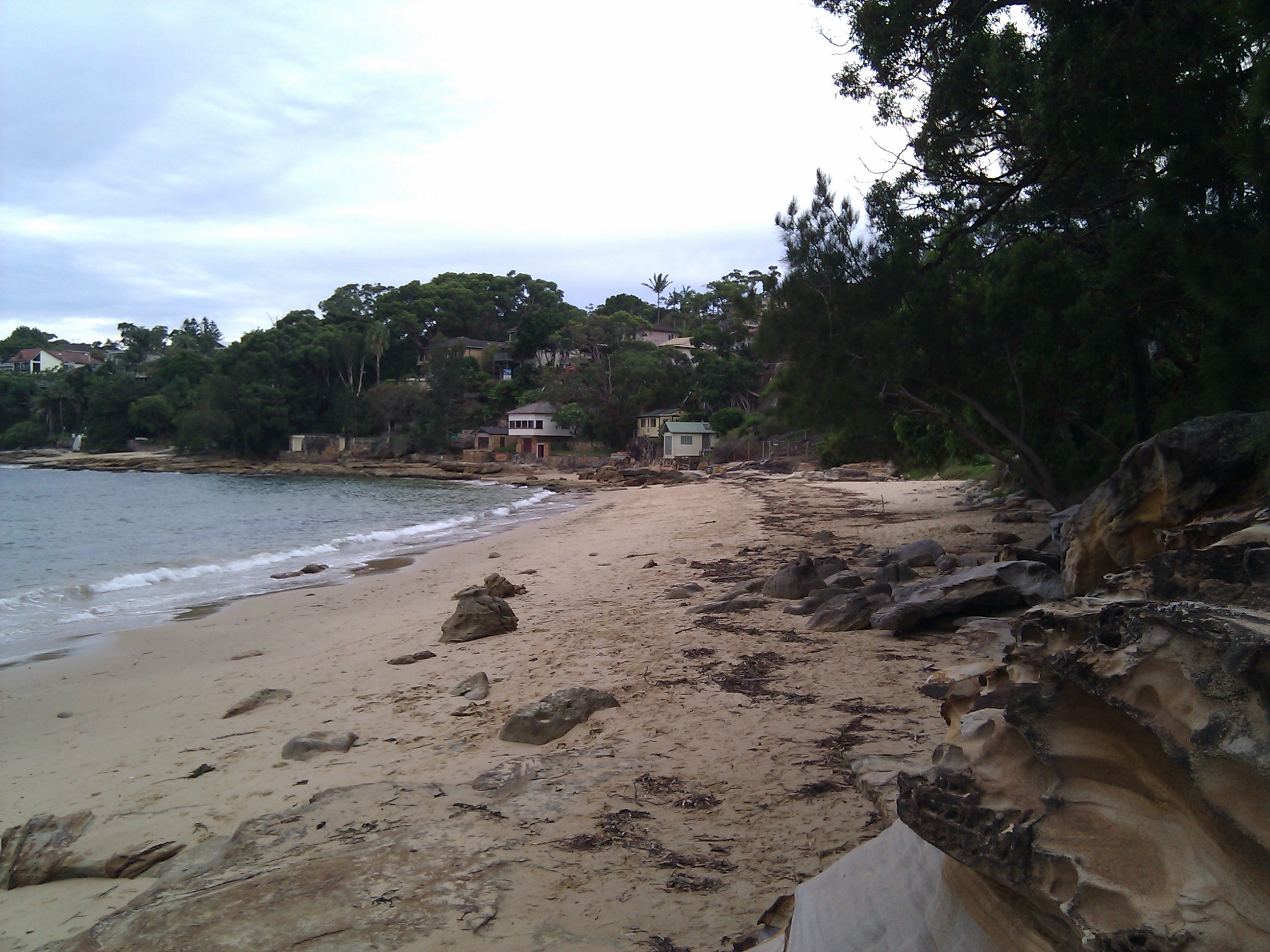
Bundeena NSW 2230, Australia – Panorama #74

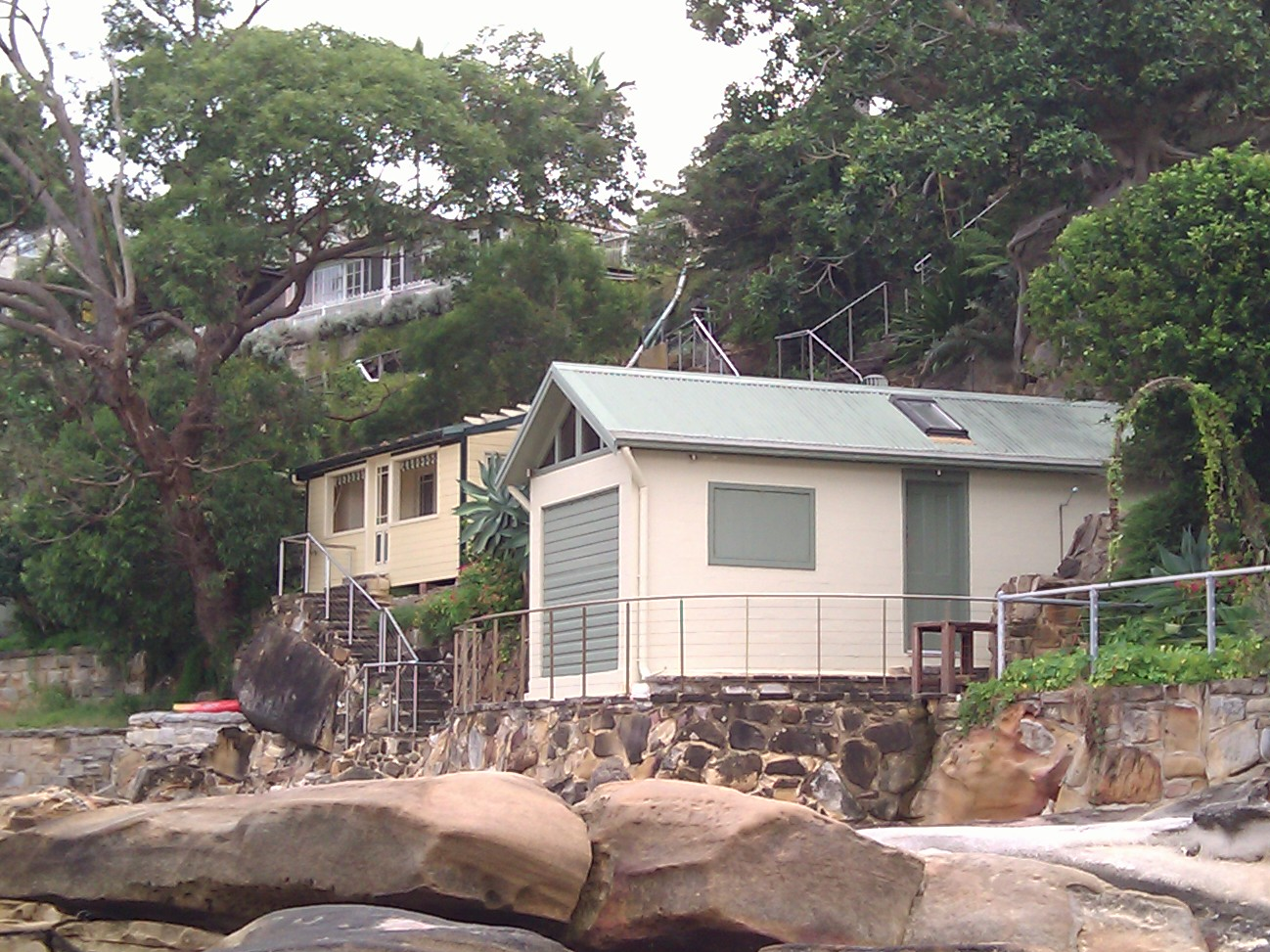
Bundeena NSW 2230, Australia – Panorama #75

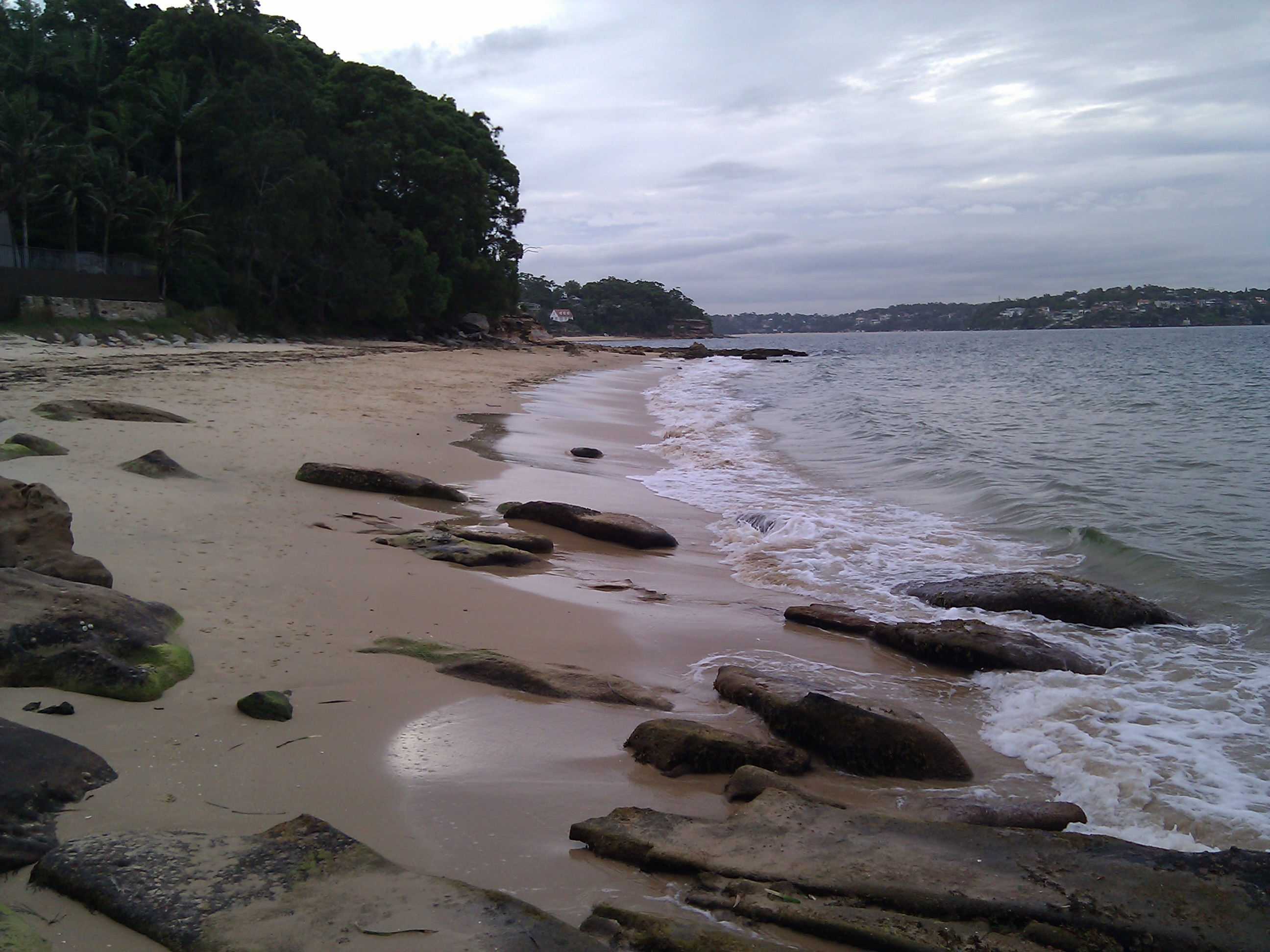
Bundeena NSW 2230, Australia – Panorama #76

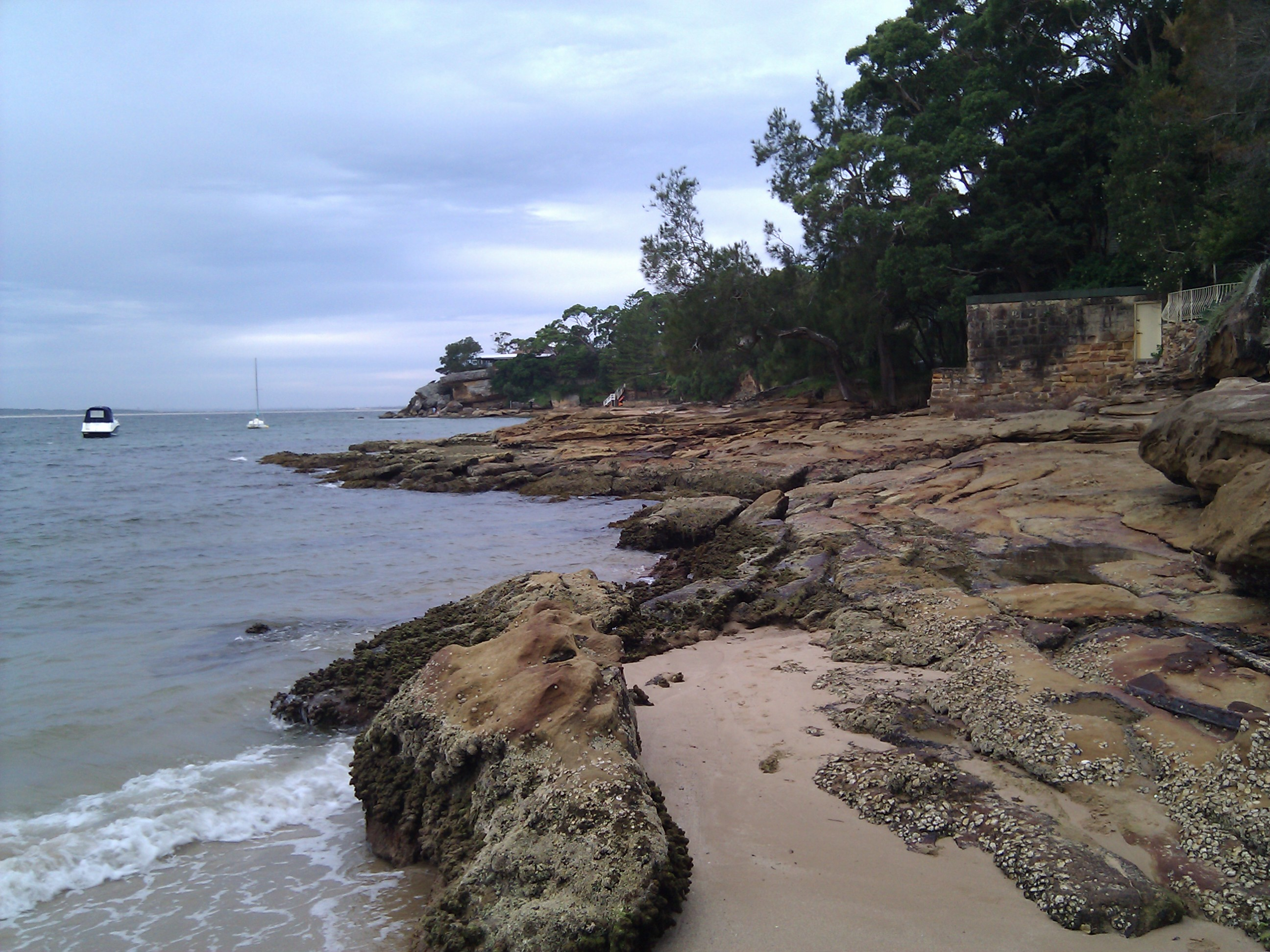
Bundeena NSW 2230, Australia – Panorama #77

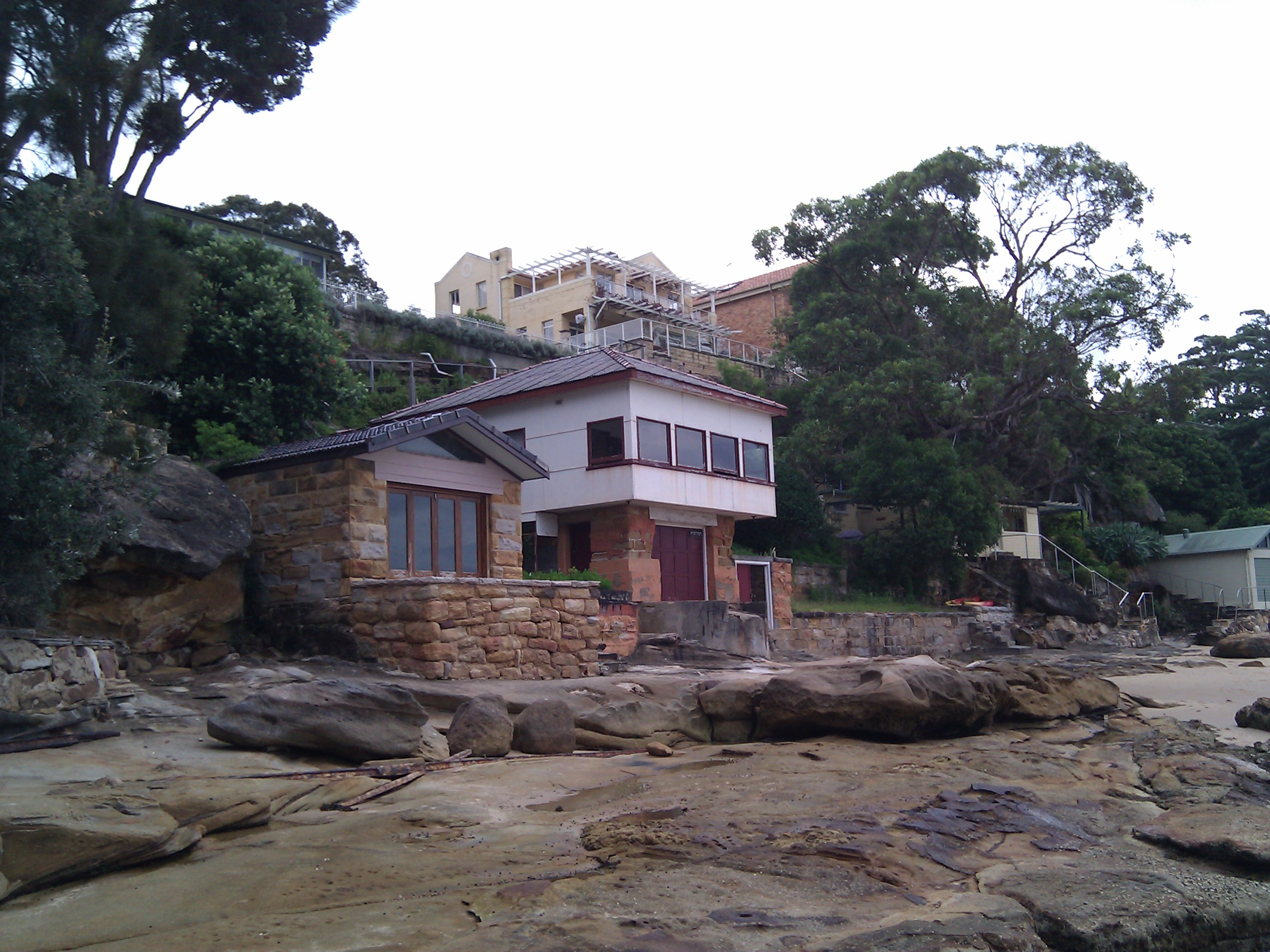
Bundeena NSW 2230, Australia – Panorama #78

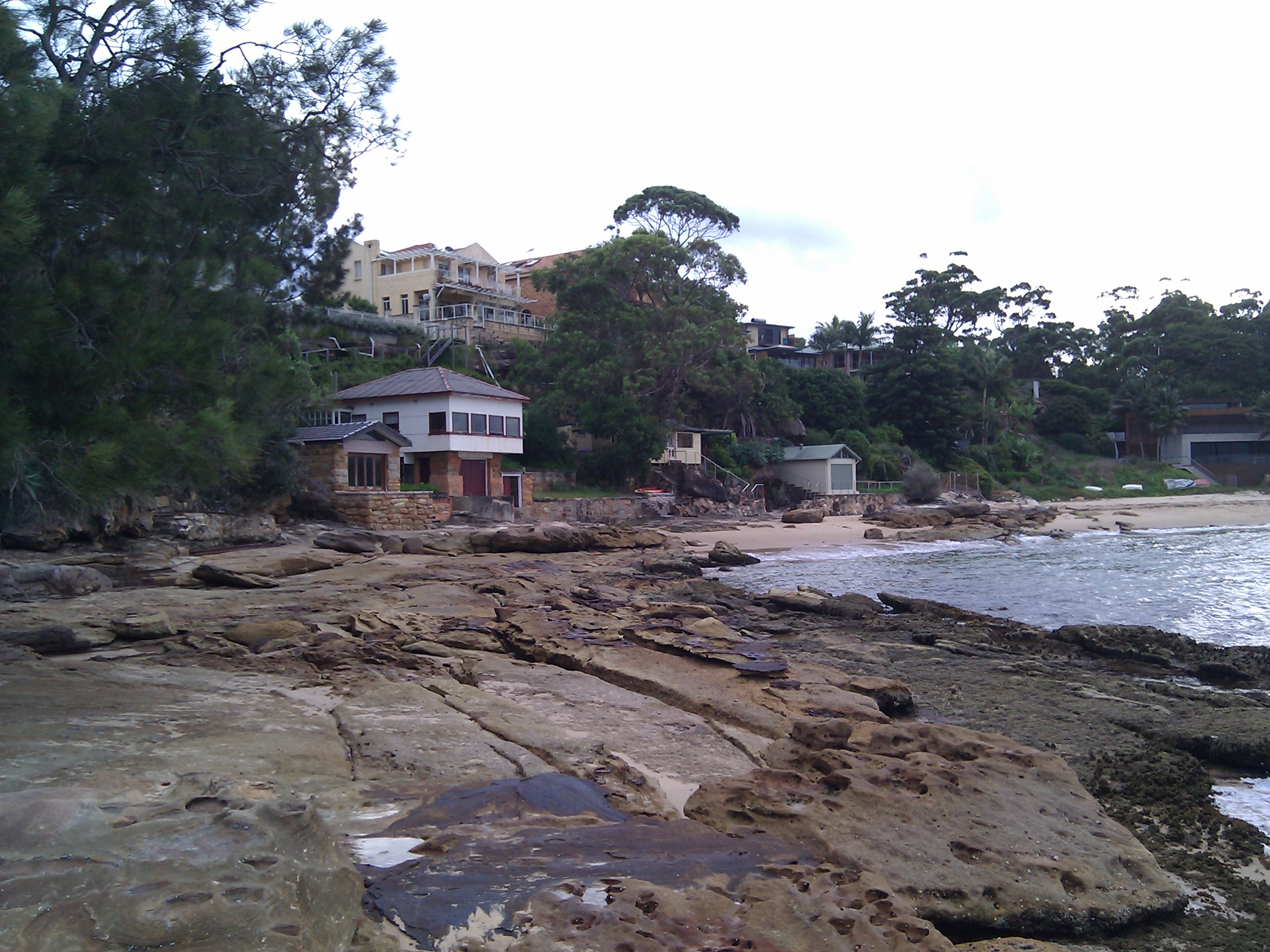
Bundeena NSW 2230, Australia – Panorama #79

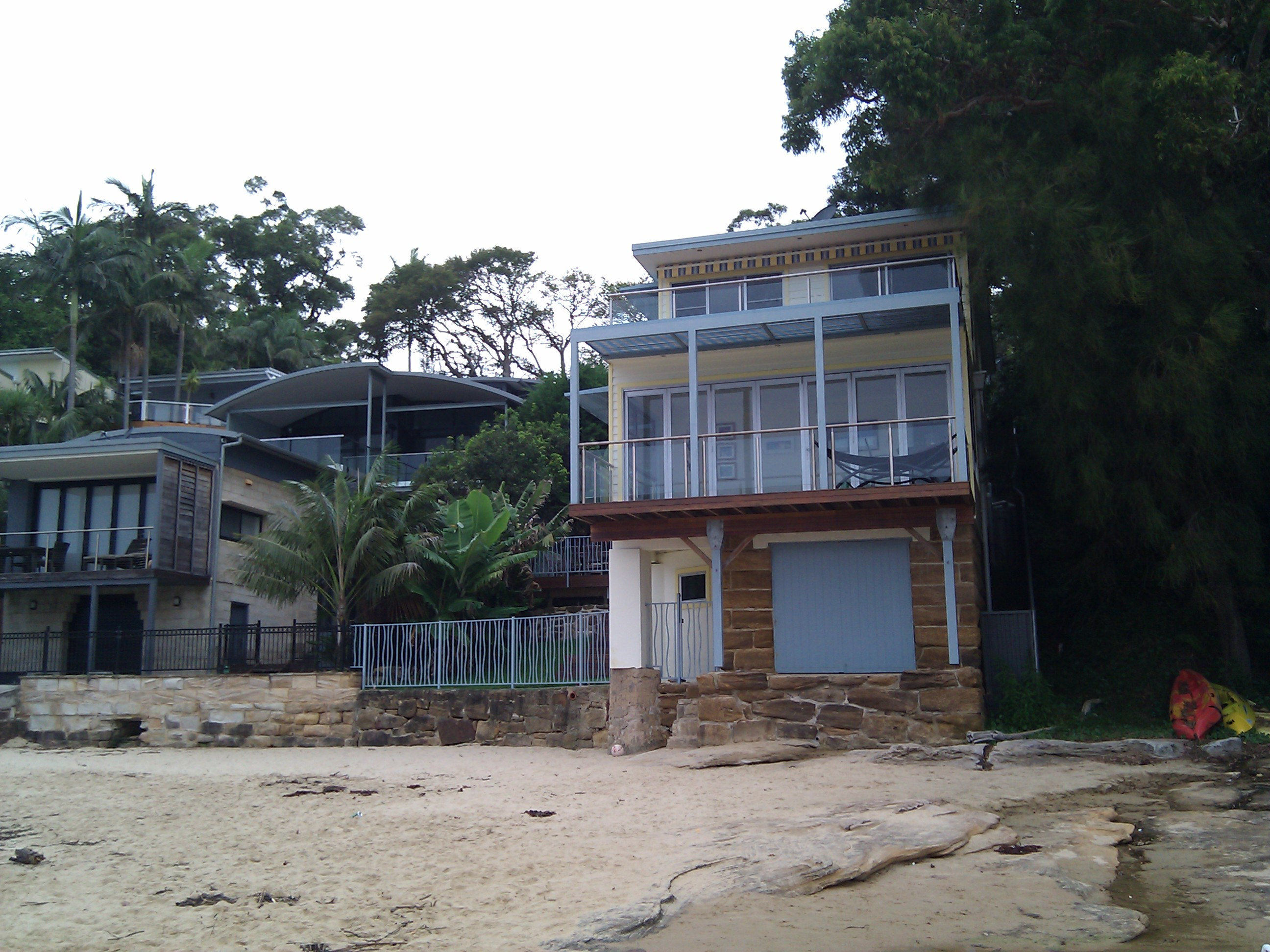
Bundeena NSW 2230, Australia – Panorama #80

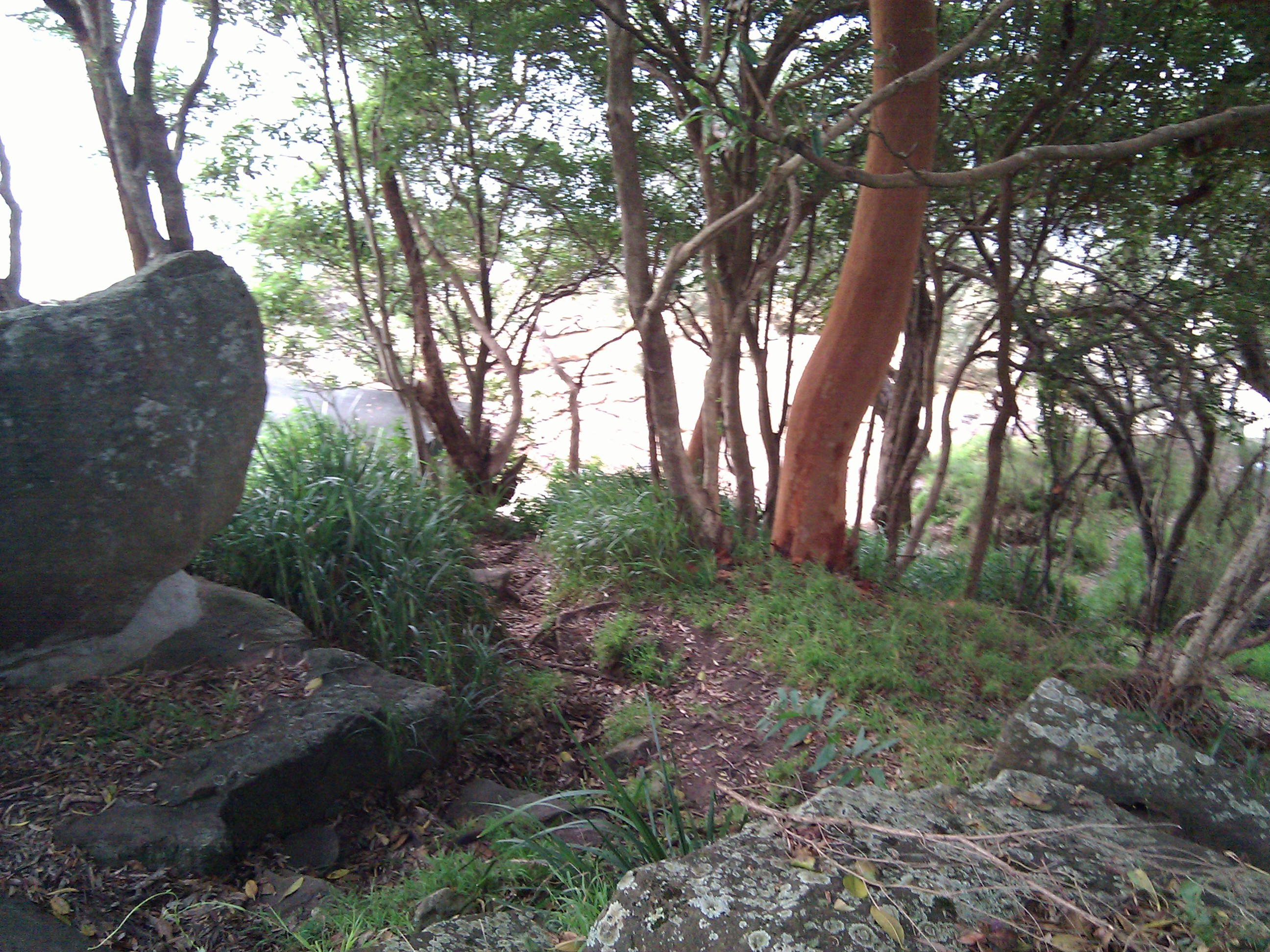
Bundeena NSW 2230, Australia – Panorama #81

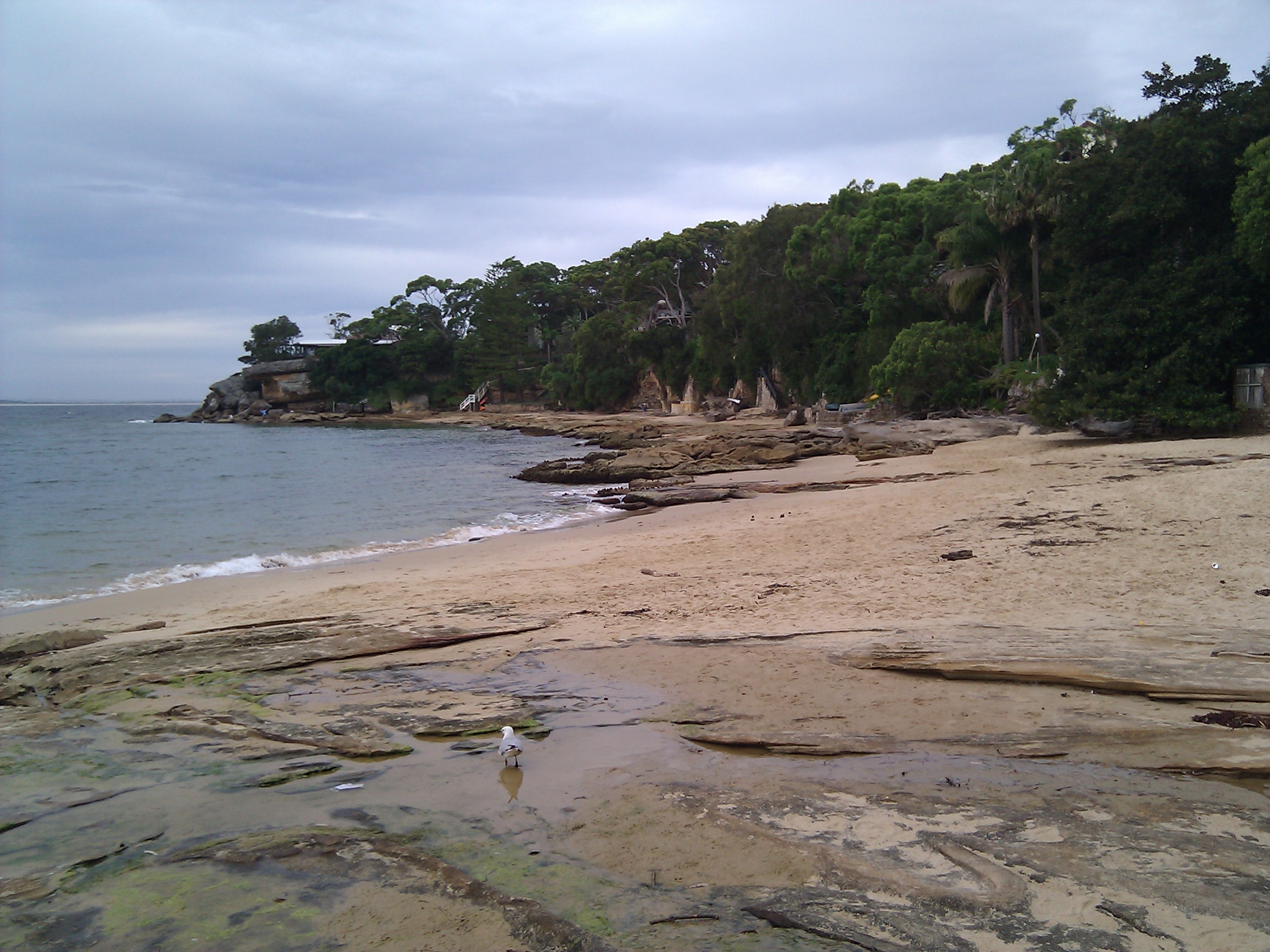
Bundeena NSW 2230, Australia – Panorama #82

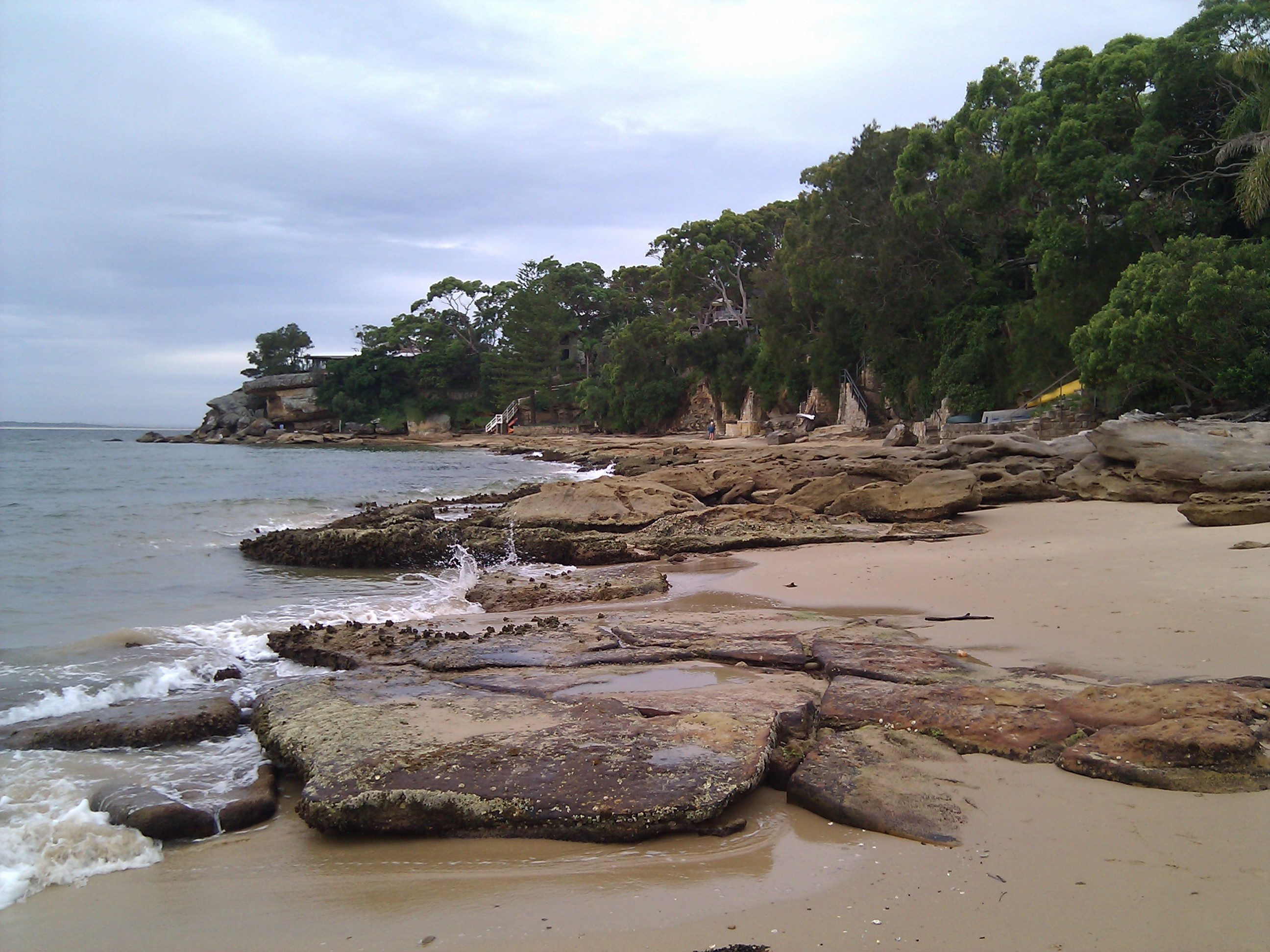
Bundeena NSW 2230, Australia – Panorama #83

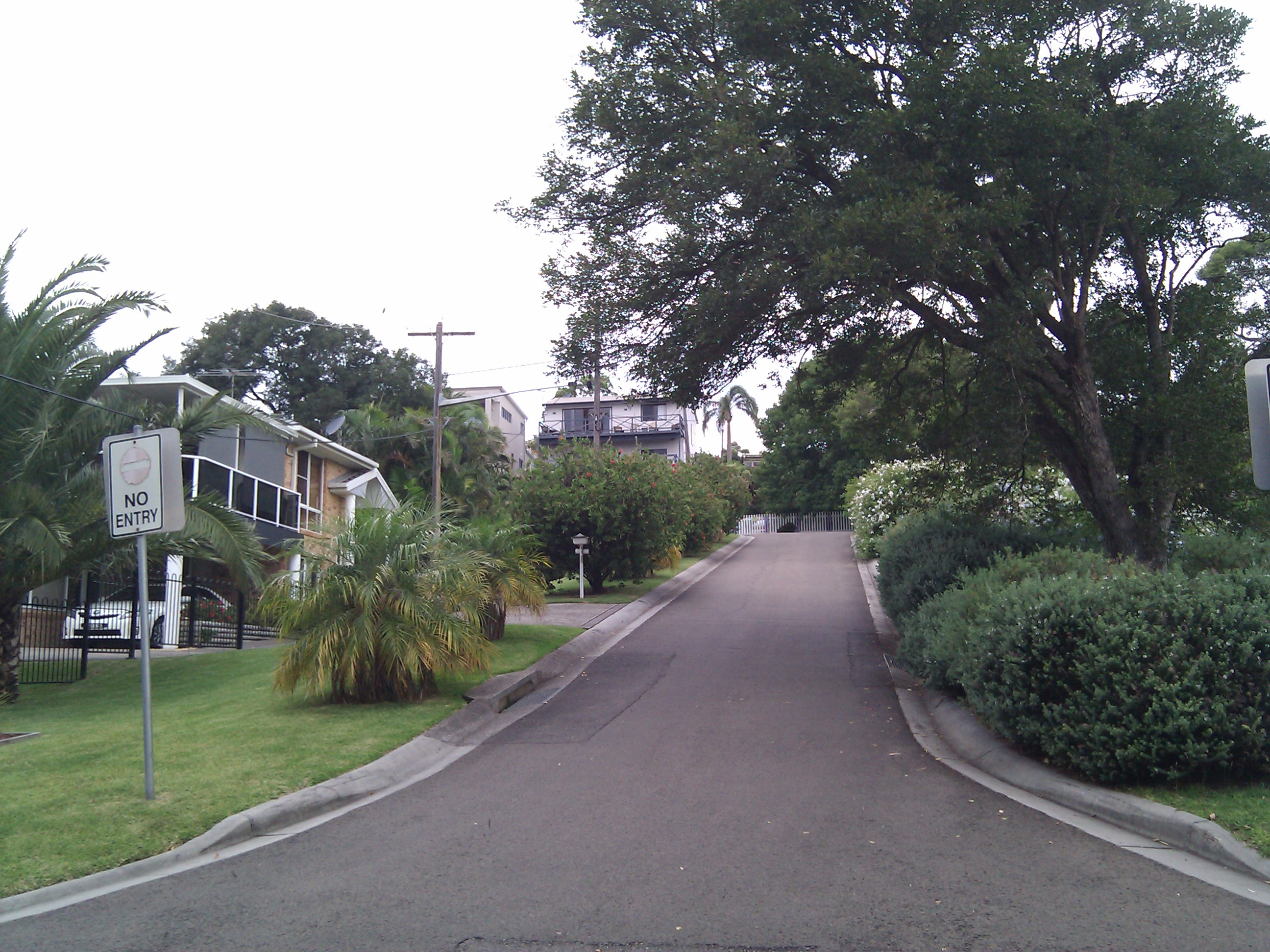
Beach Street from Loftus Street, Bundeena

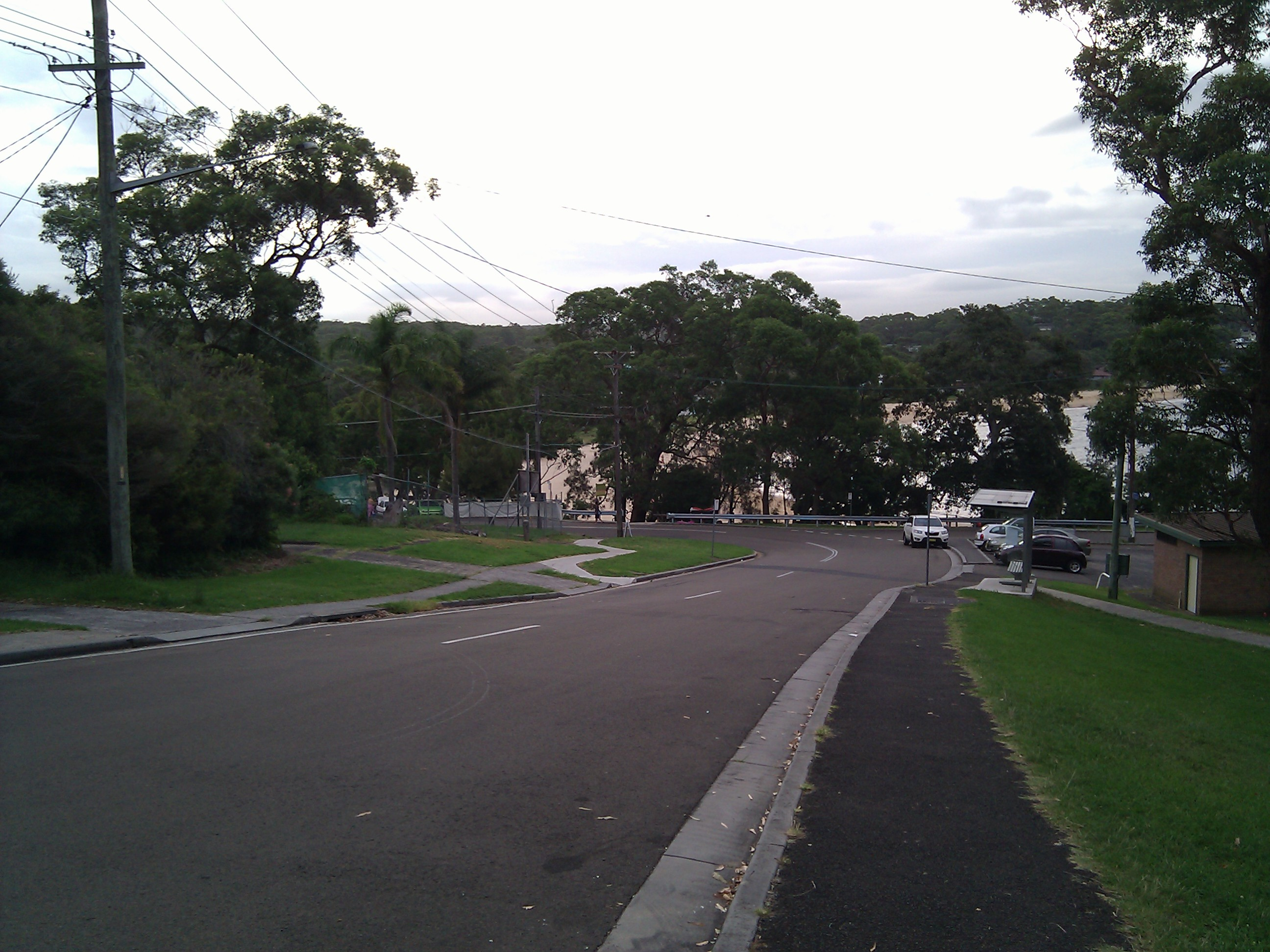
Loftus Street, Bundeena #1

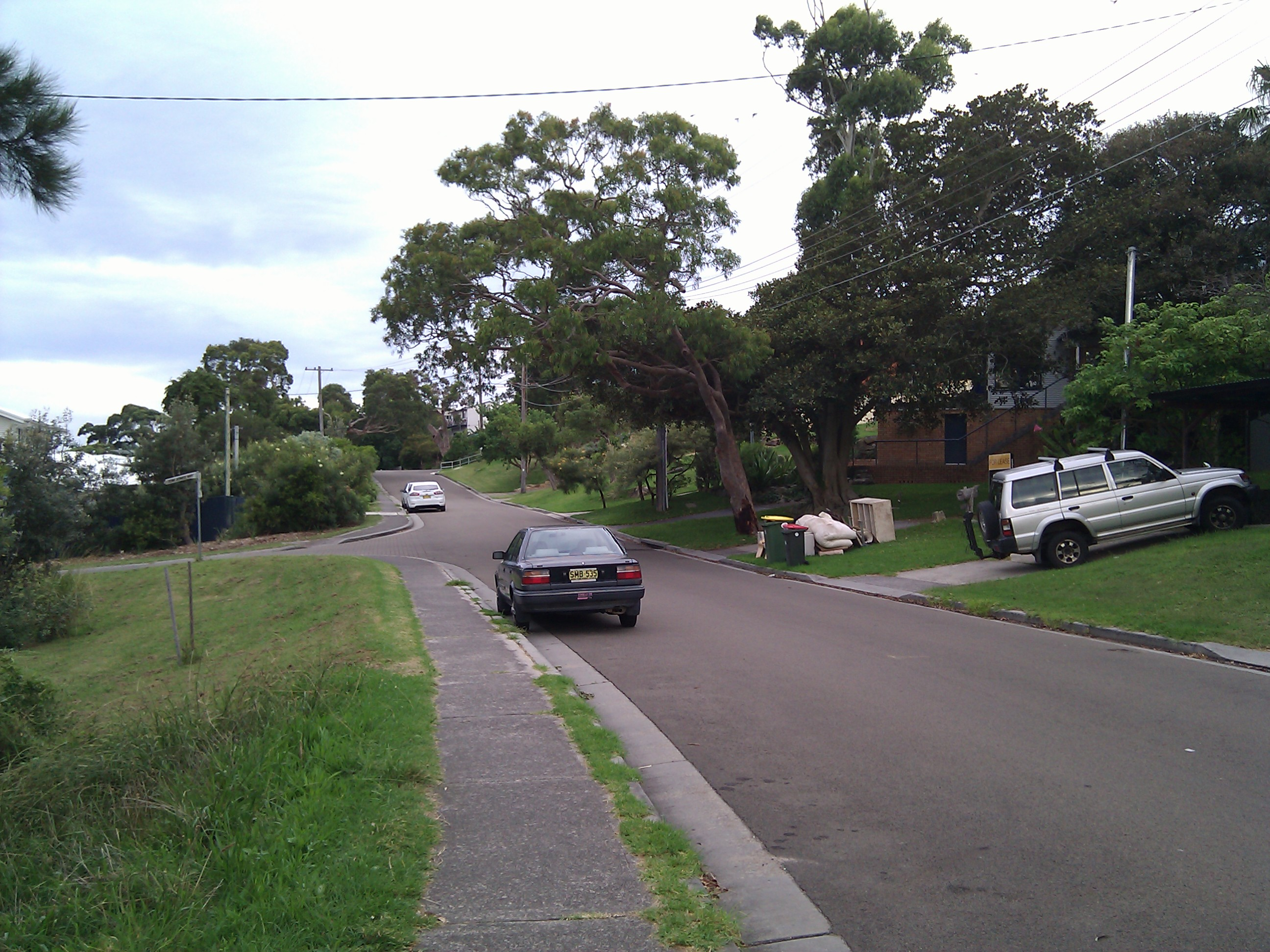
Loftus Street, Bundeena #2

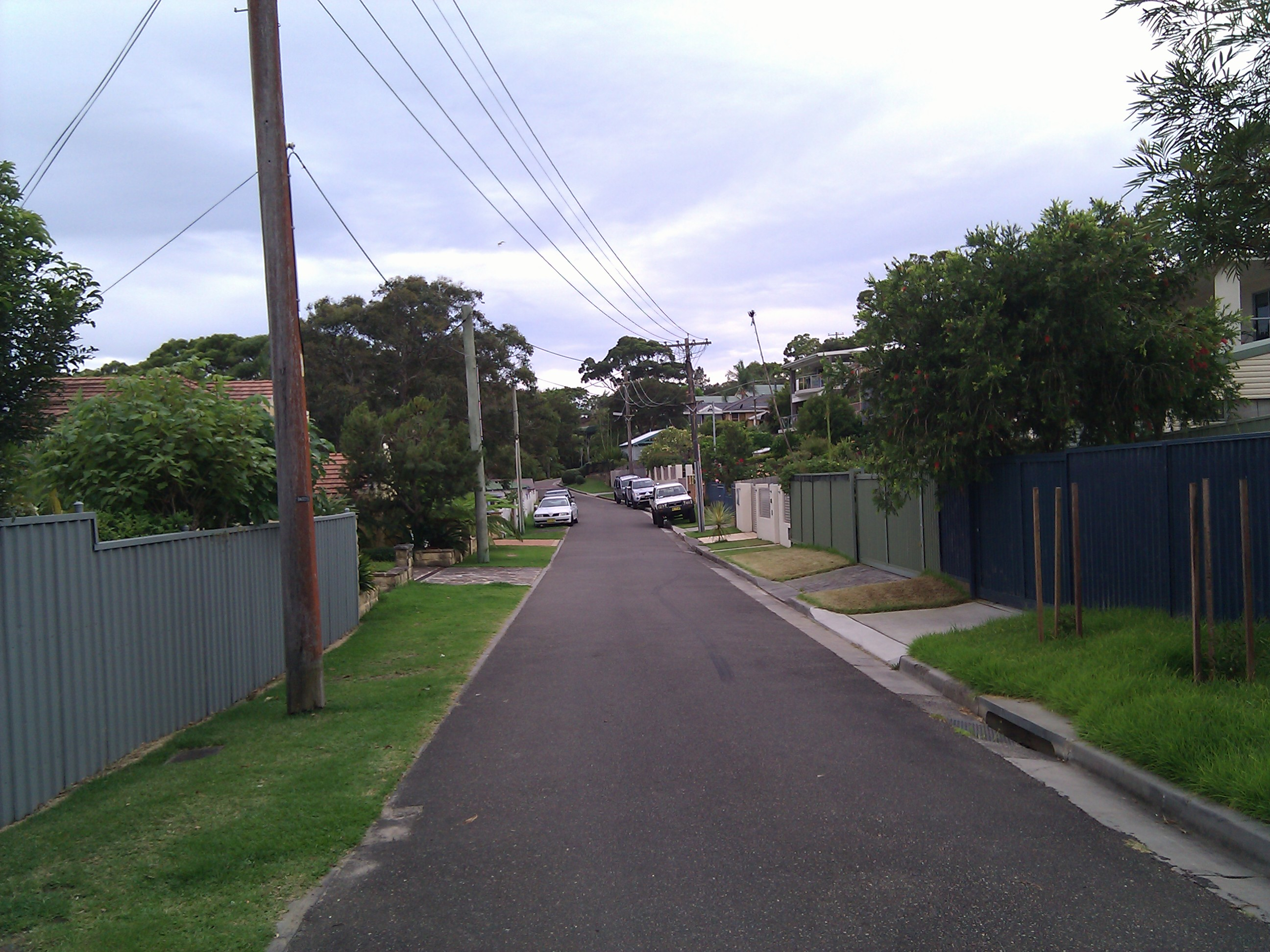
Loftus Street, Bundeena #3

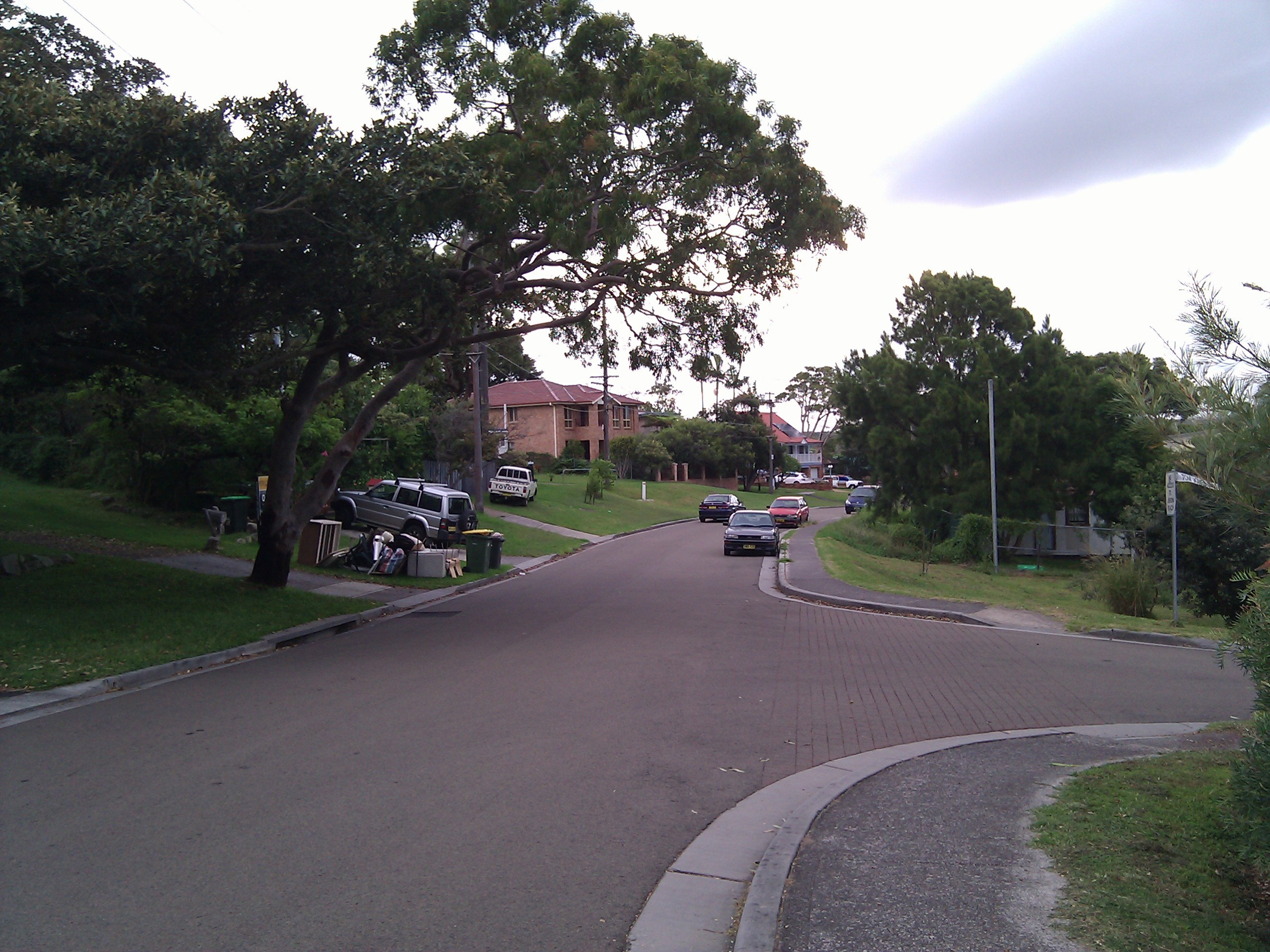
Loftus Street, Bundeena #4

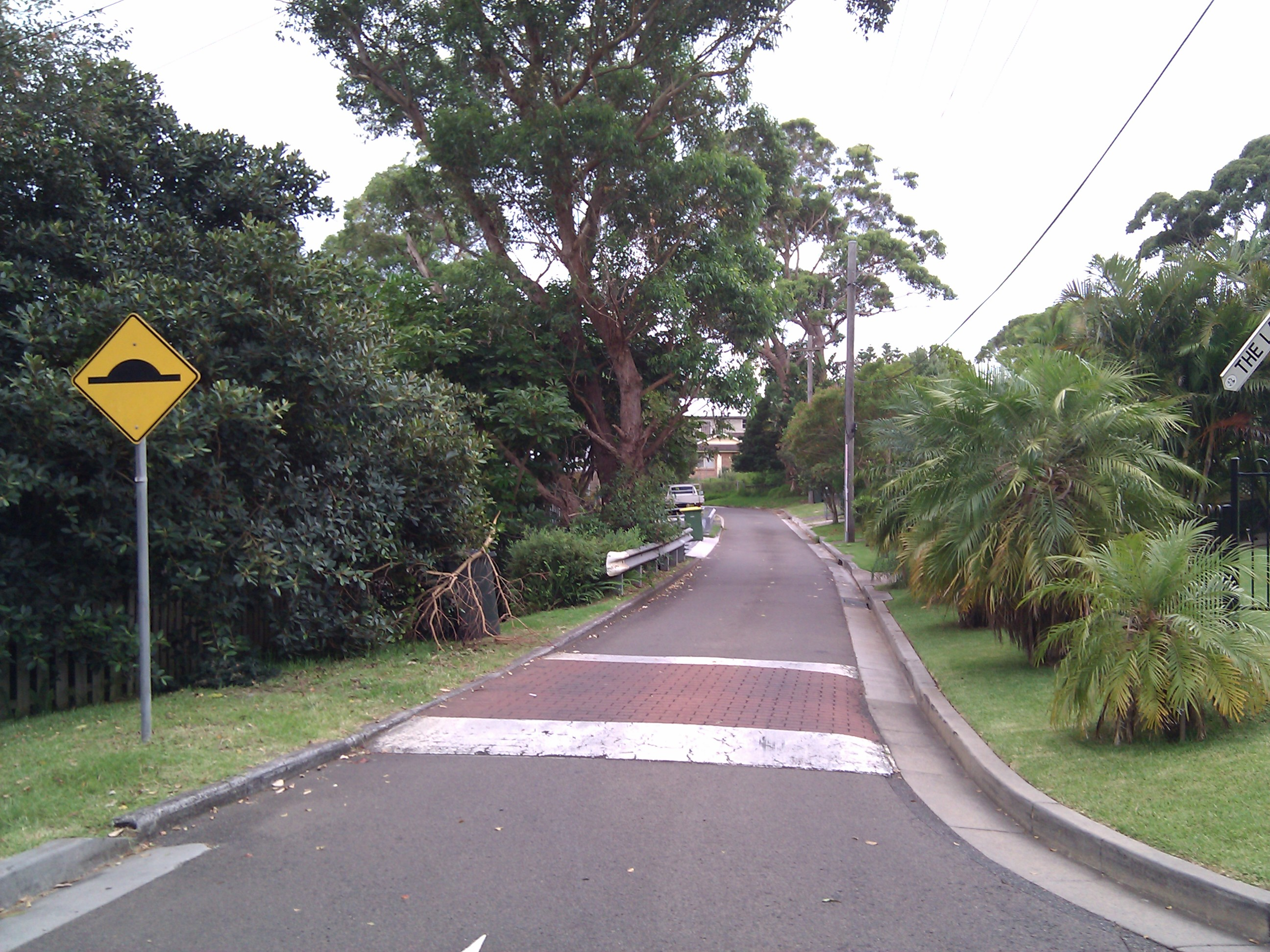
Loftus Street, Bundeena #5

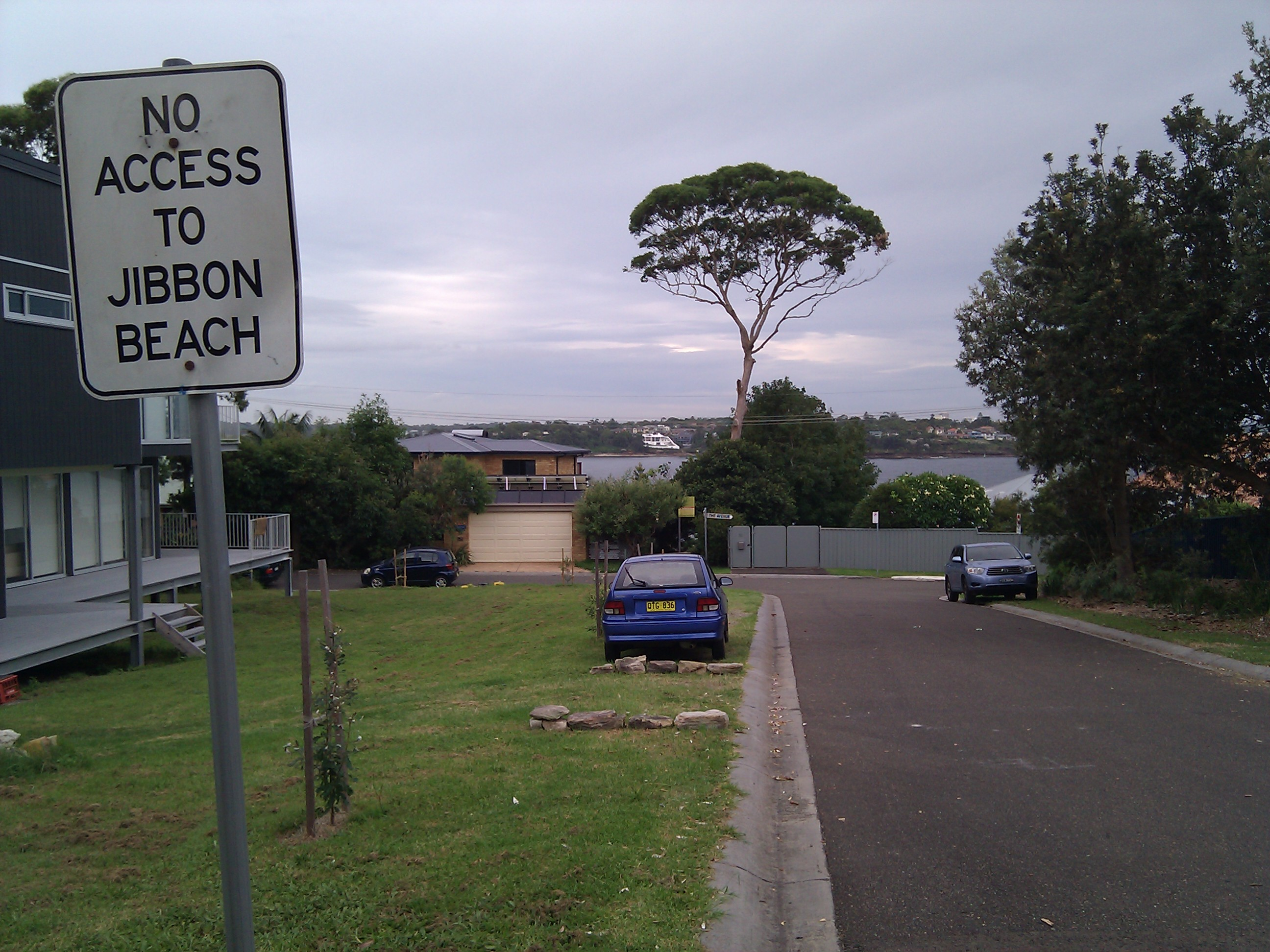
Tom Jones Way, Bundeena

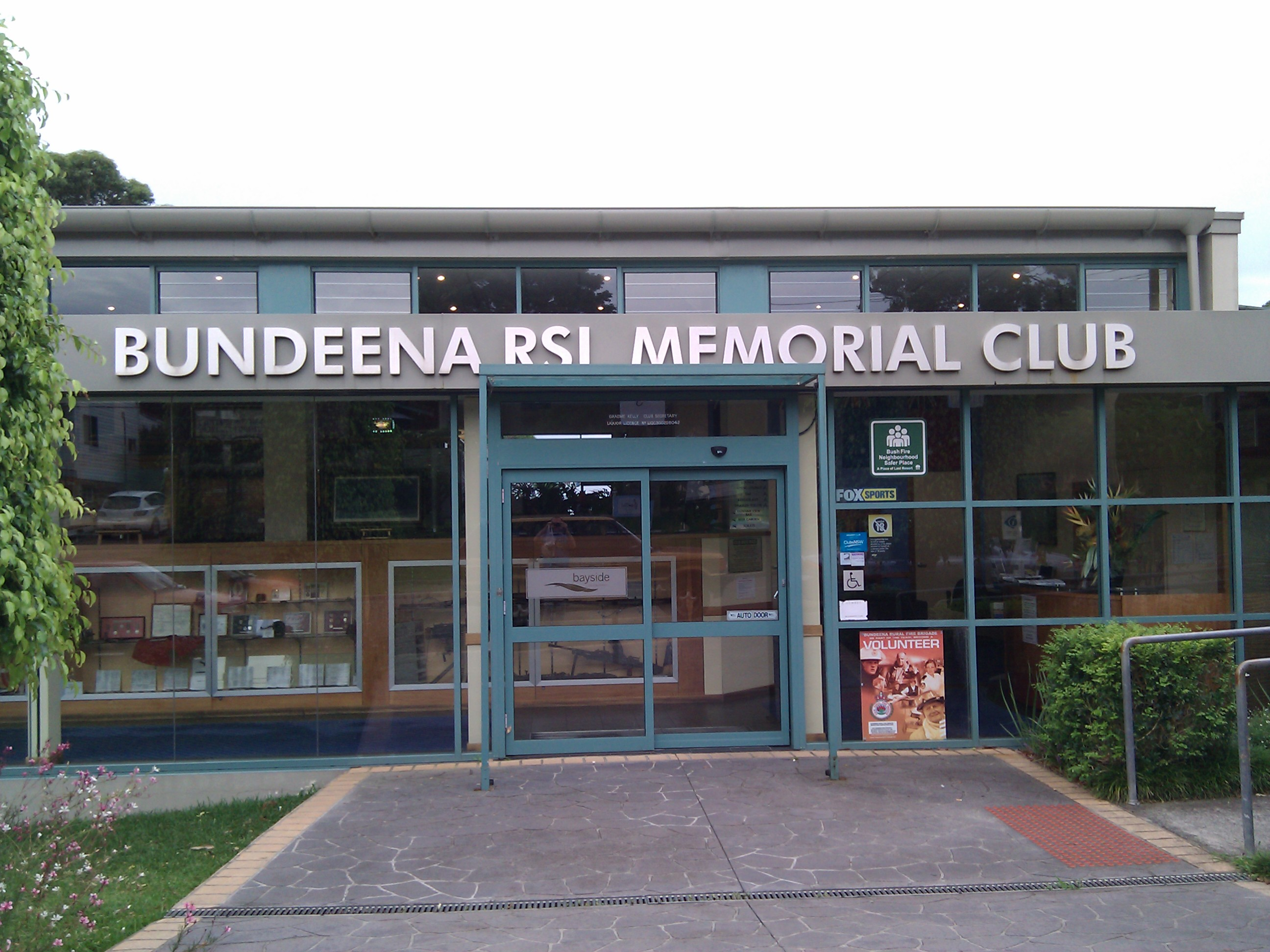
Bundeena RSL Memorial Club

Bundeena NSW 2230, Australia – Panorama #84

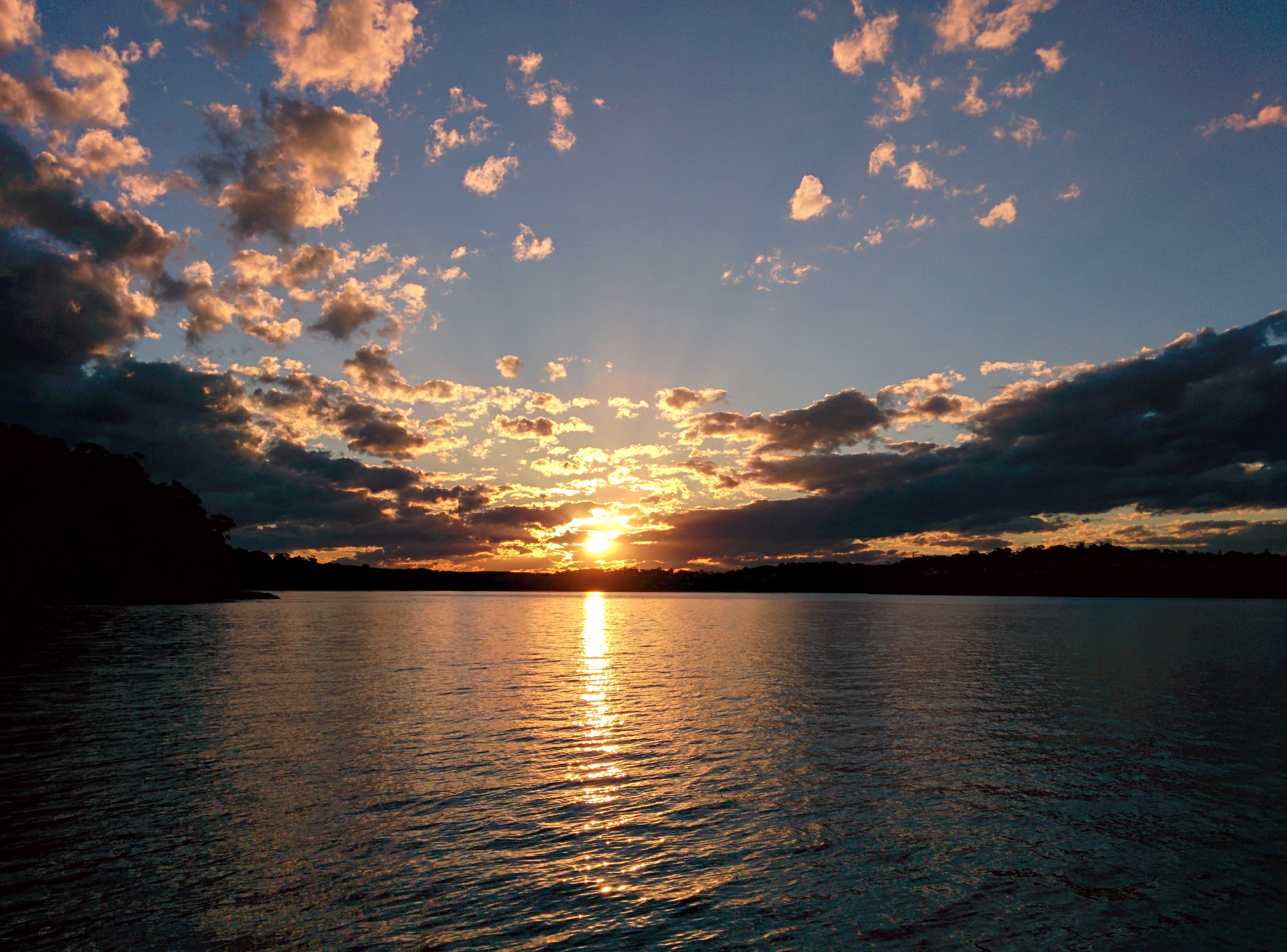
Bundeena NSW 2230, Australia – Panorama #85

Bundeena NSW 2230, Australia – Panorama #86

Bundeena NSW 2230, Australia – Panorama #87

Bundeena NSW 2230, Australia – Panorama #88

Bundeena NSW 2230, Australia – Panorama #89

Bundeena NSW 2230, Australia – Panorama #90

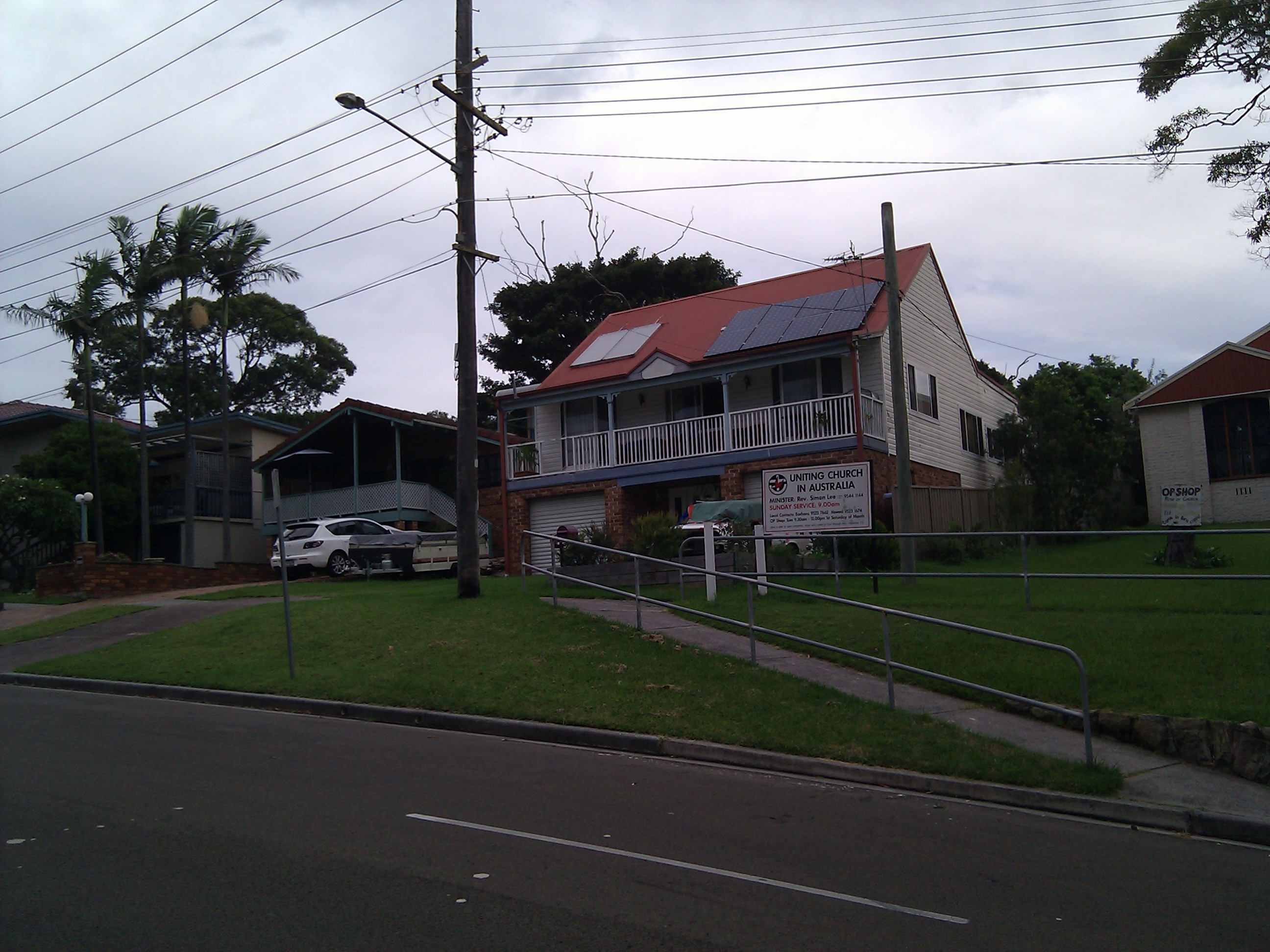
Bundeena NSW 2230, Australia – Panorama #91

Bundeena NSW 2230, Australia – Panorama #92

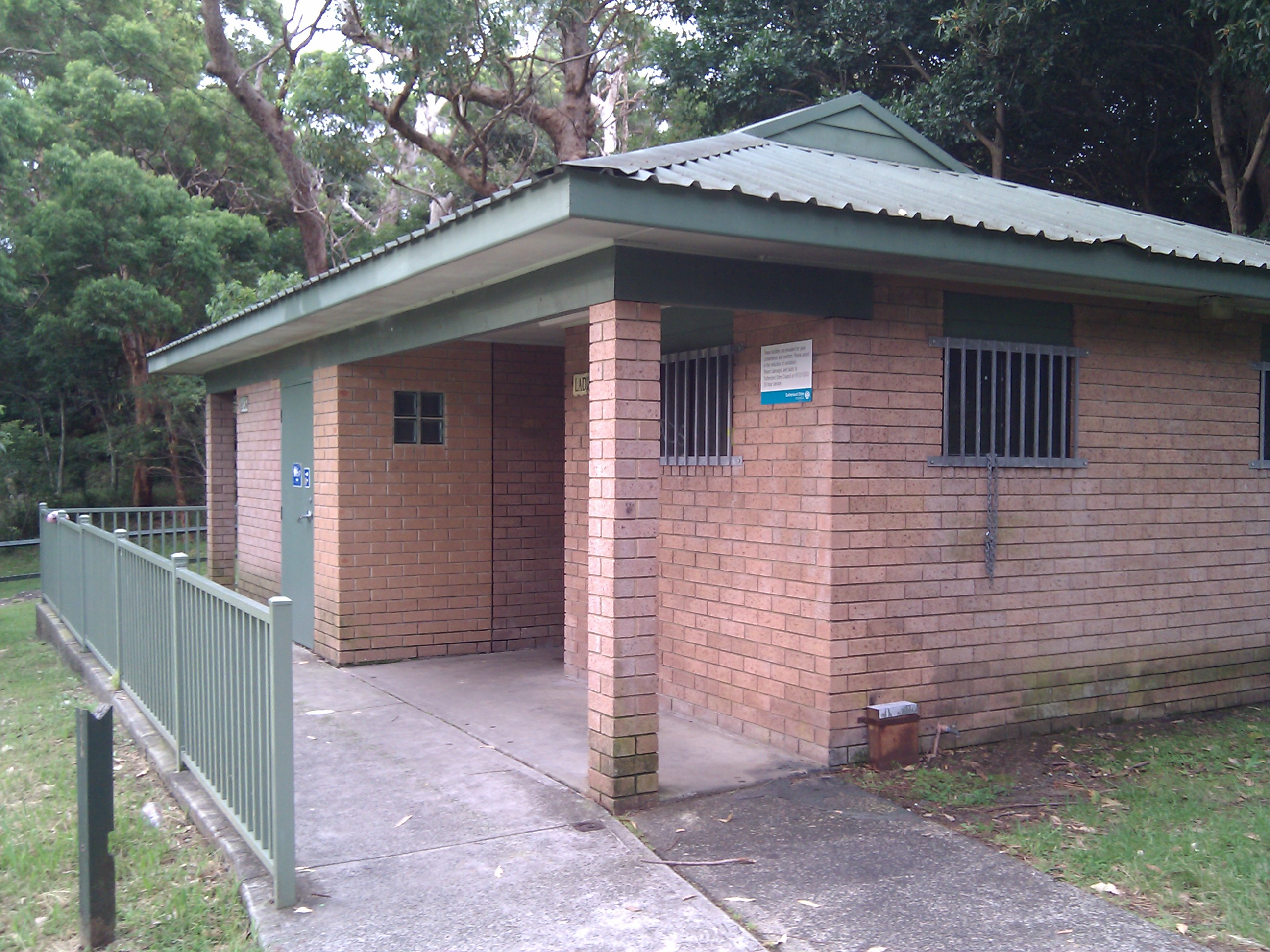
Bundeena NSW 2230, Australia – Panorama #93

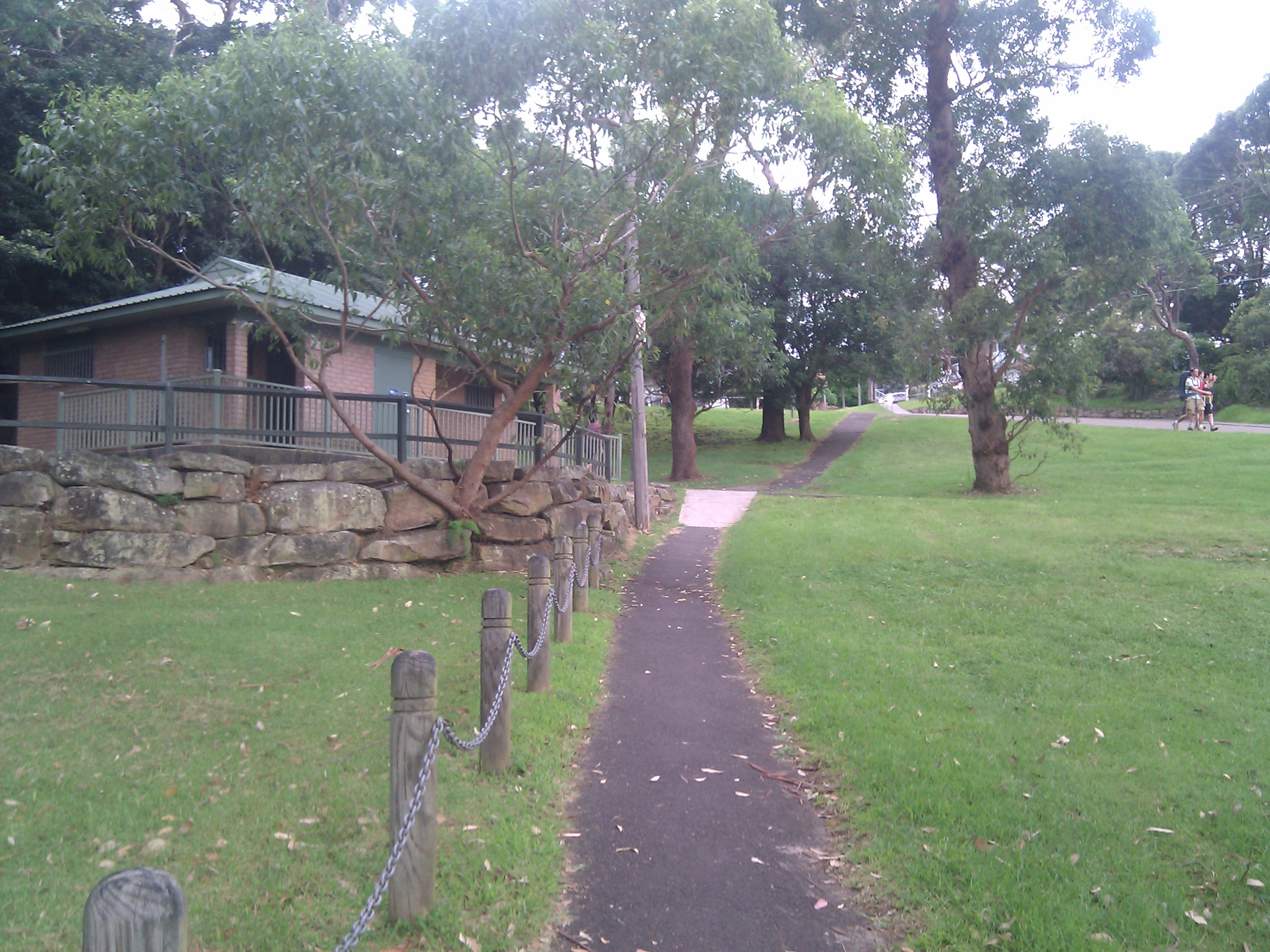
Bundeena NSW 2230, Australia – Panorama #94

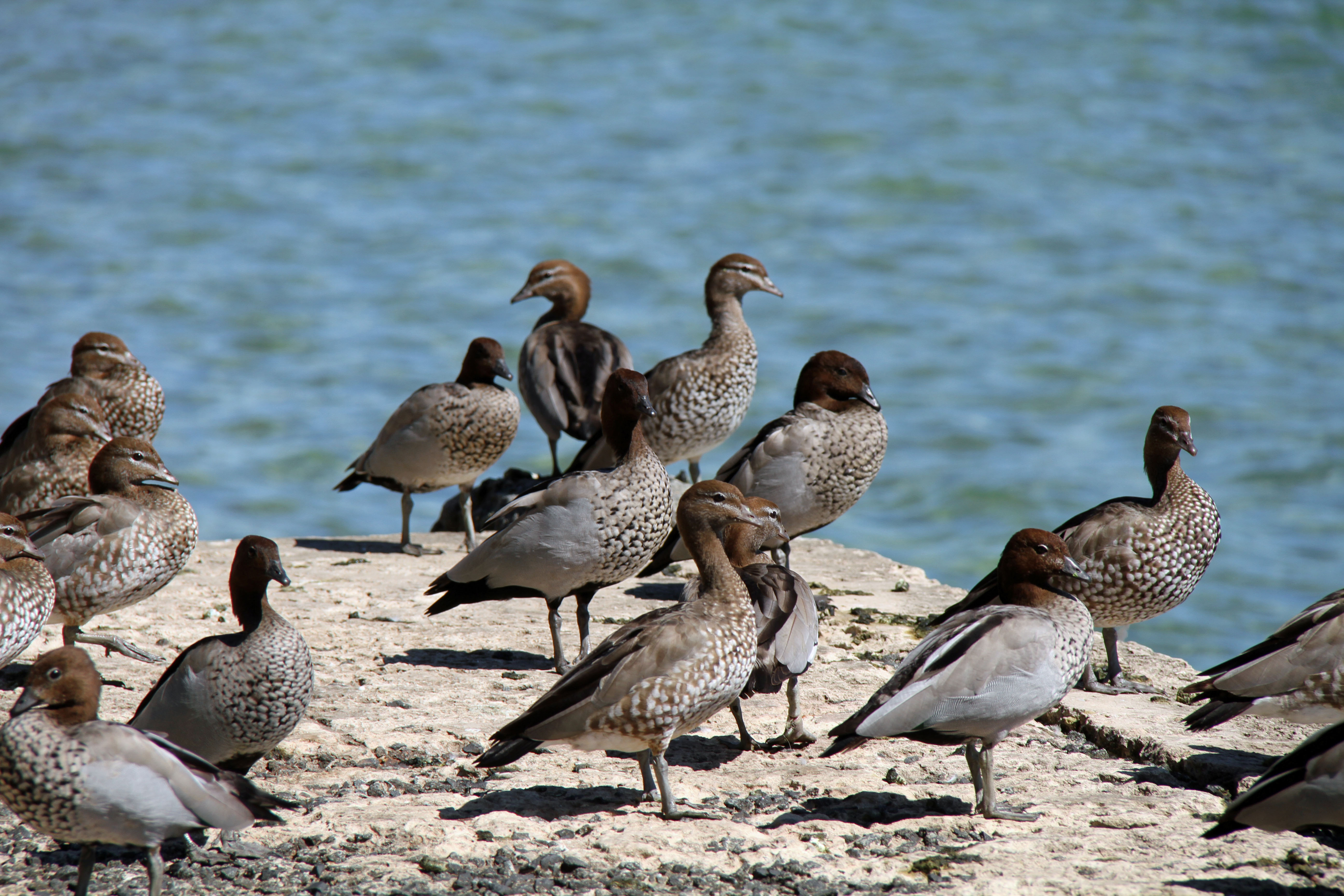
Australian Wood Ducks in Bundeena

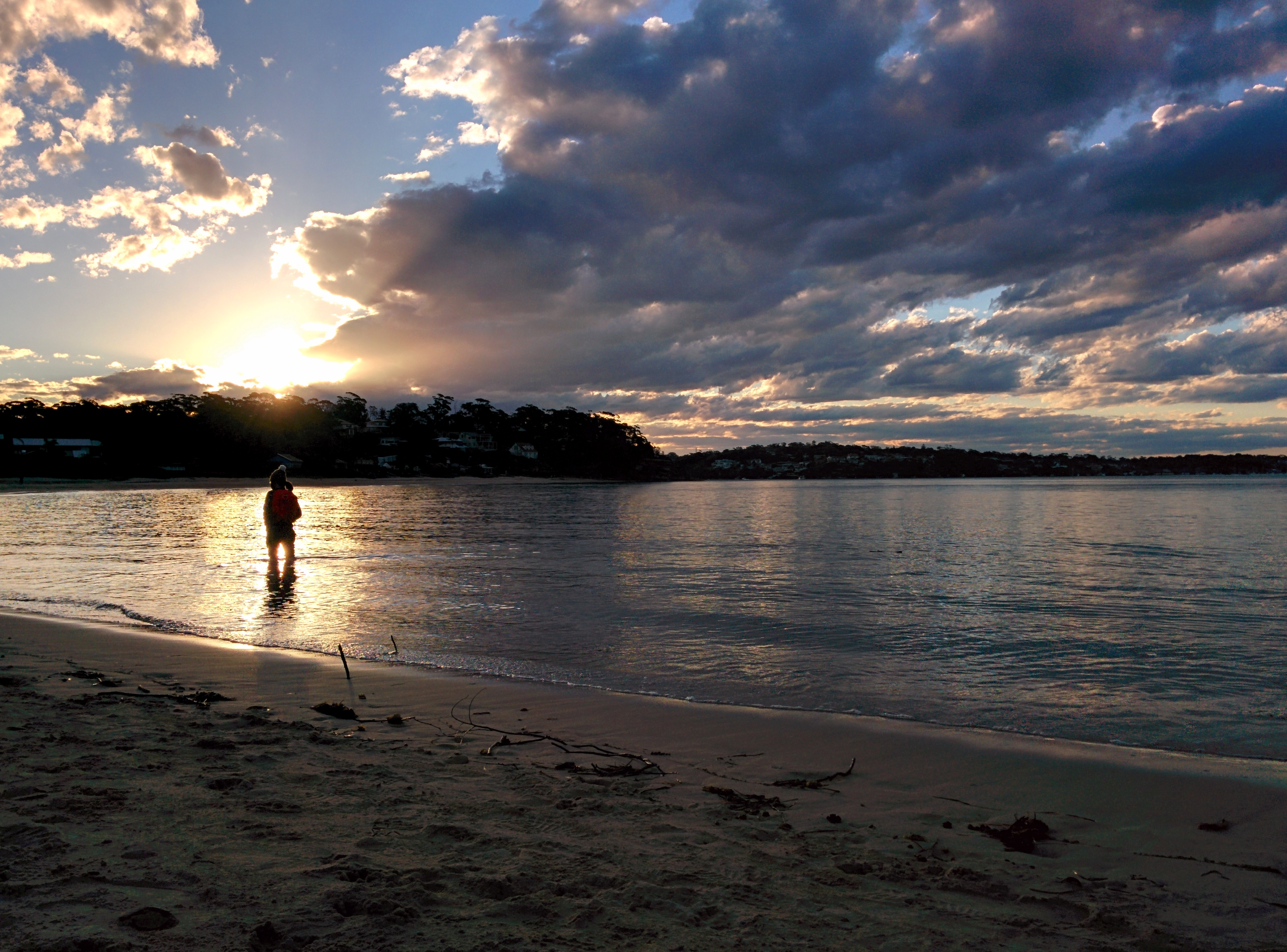
Bundeena NSW 2230, Australia - Panoramio #95

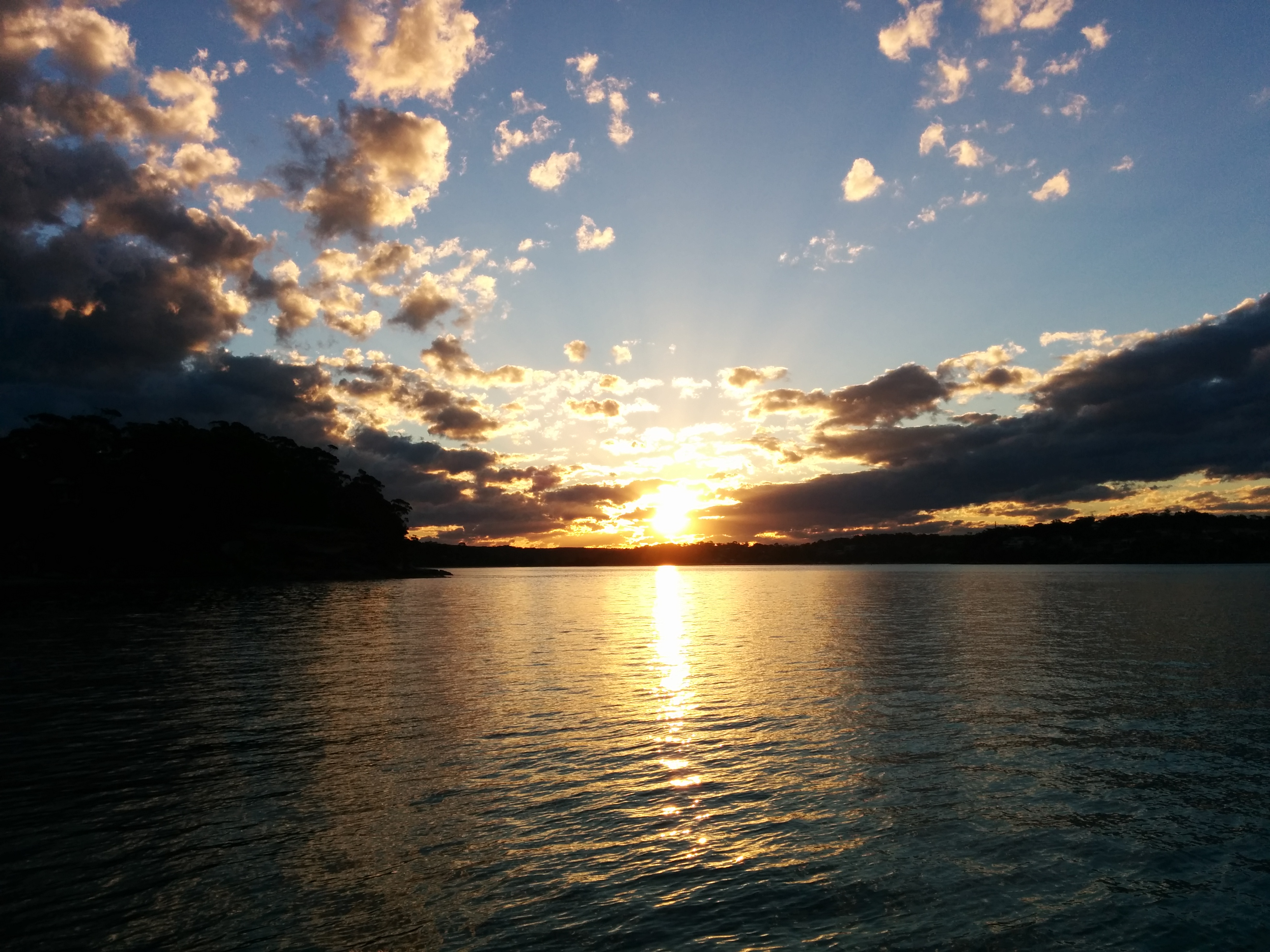
Bundeena NSW 2230, Australia - Panoramio #96

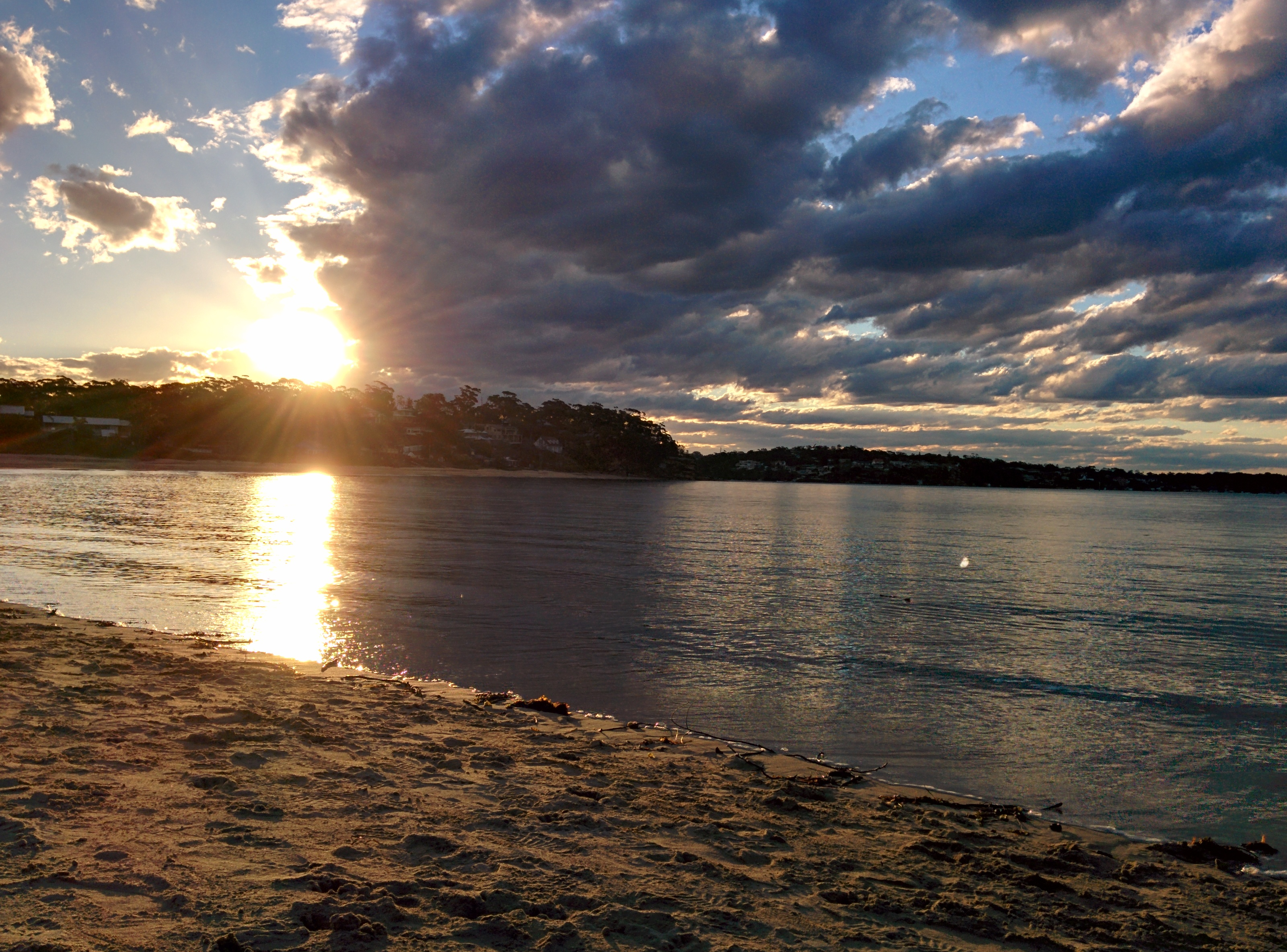
Bundeena NSW 2230, Australia - Panoramio #97

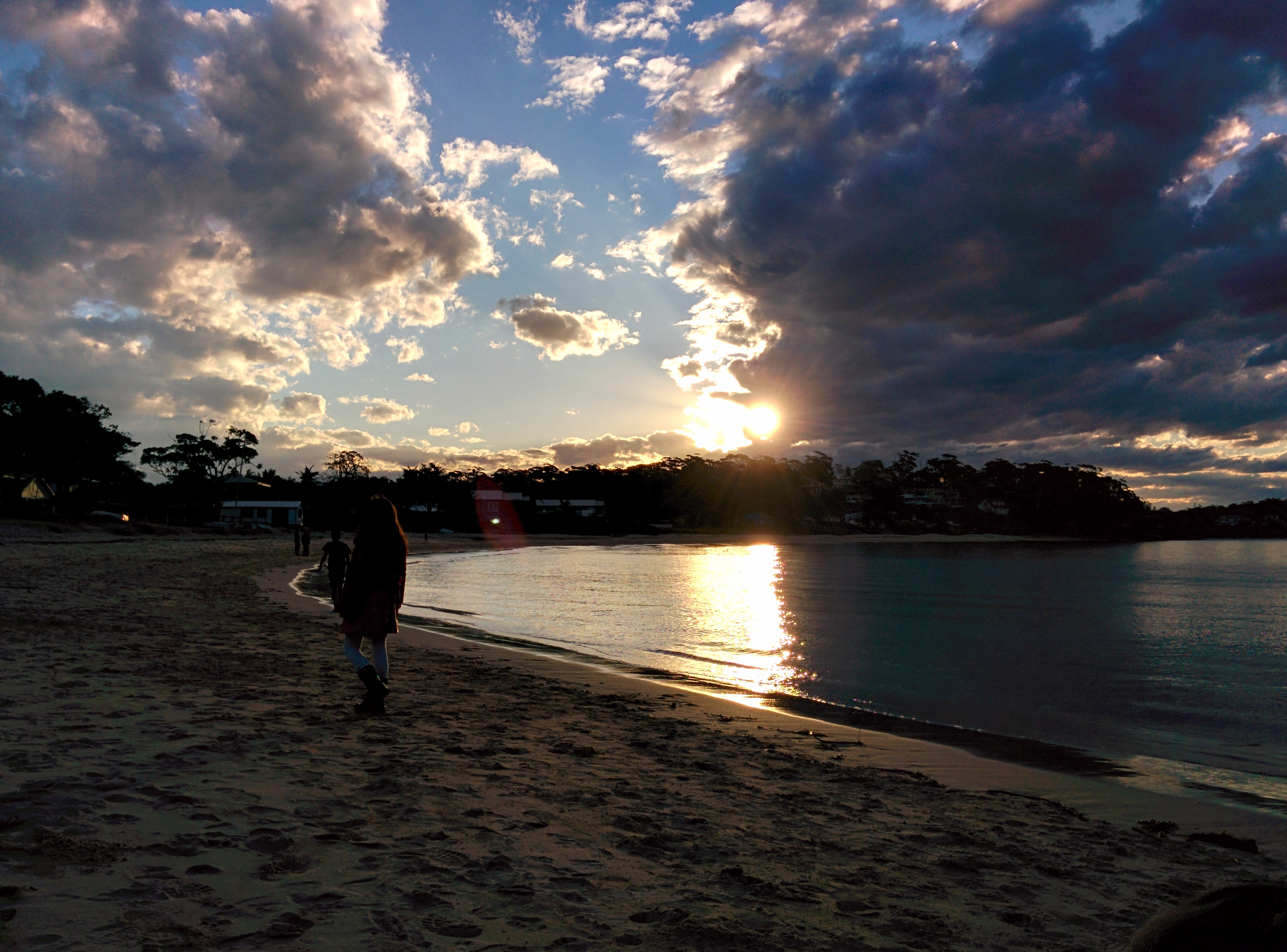
Bundeena NSW 2230, Australia - Panoramio #98

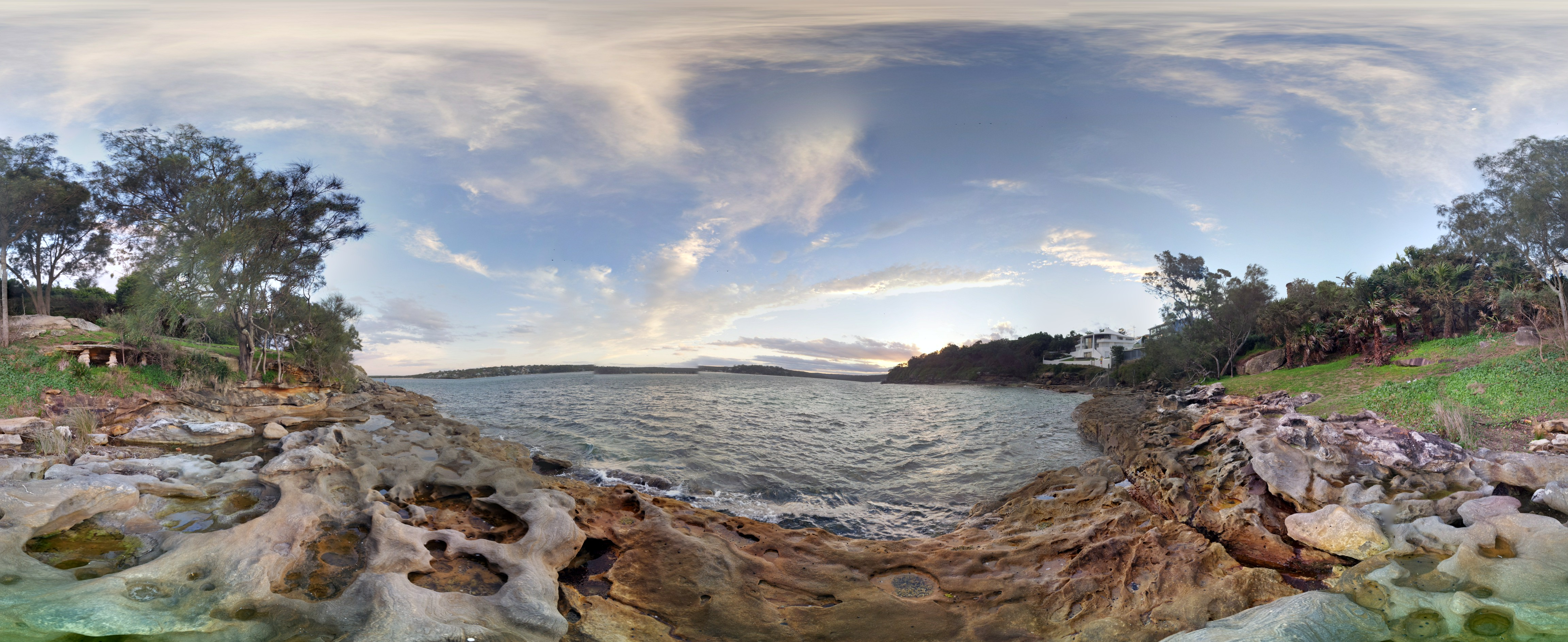
Bundeena NSW 2230, Australia - Panoramio #99

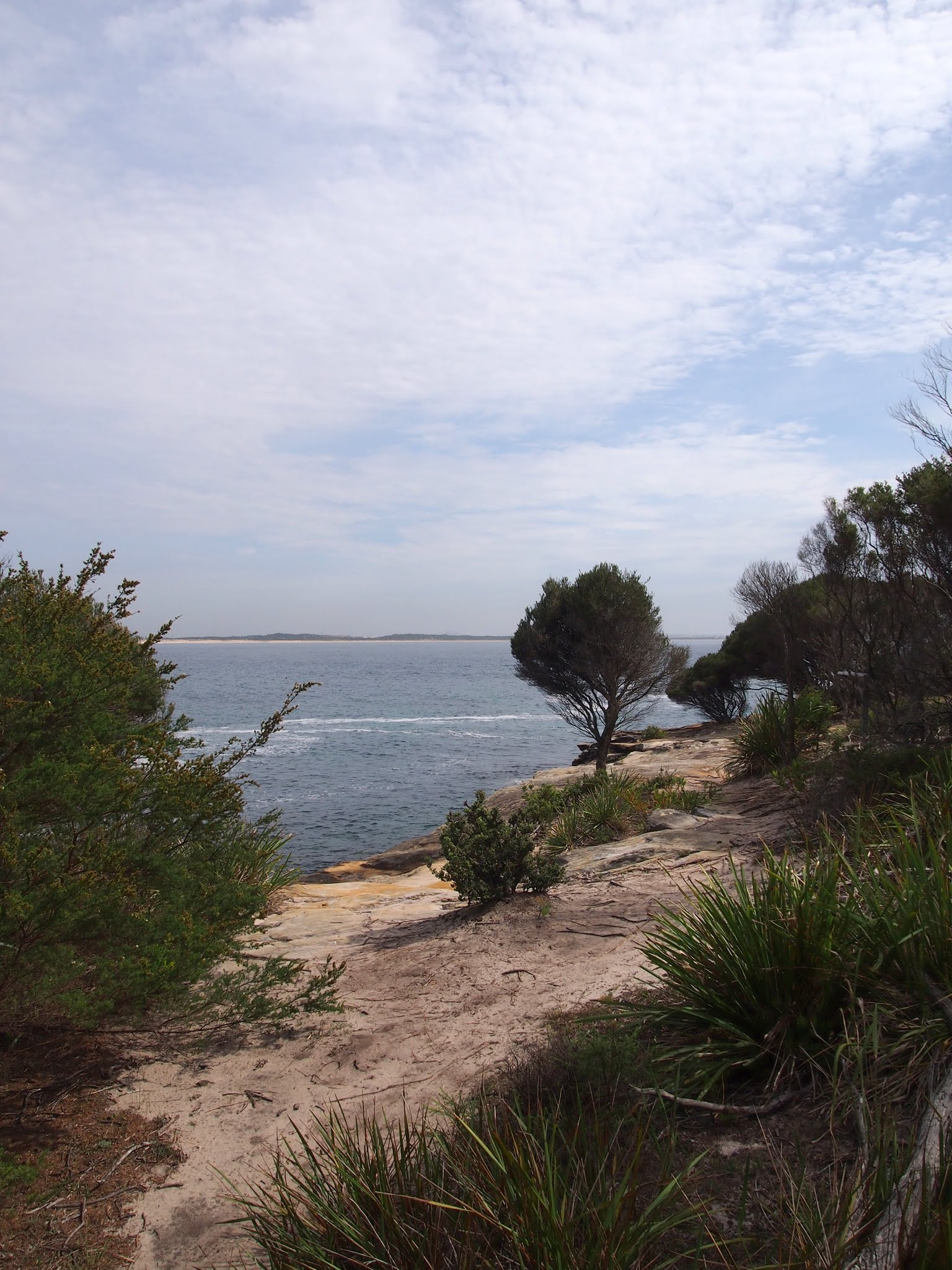
Jibbon Track (#1)

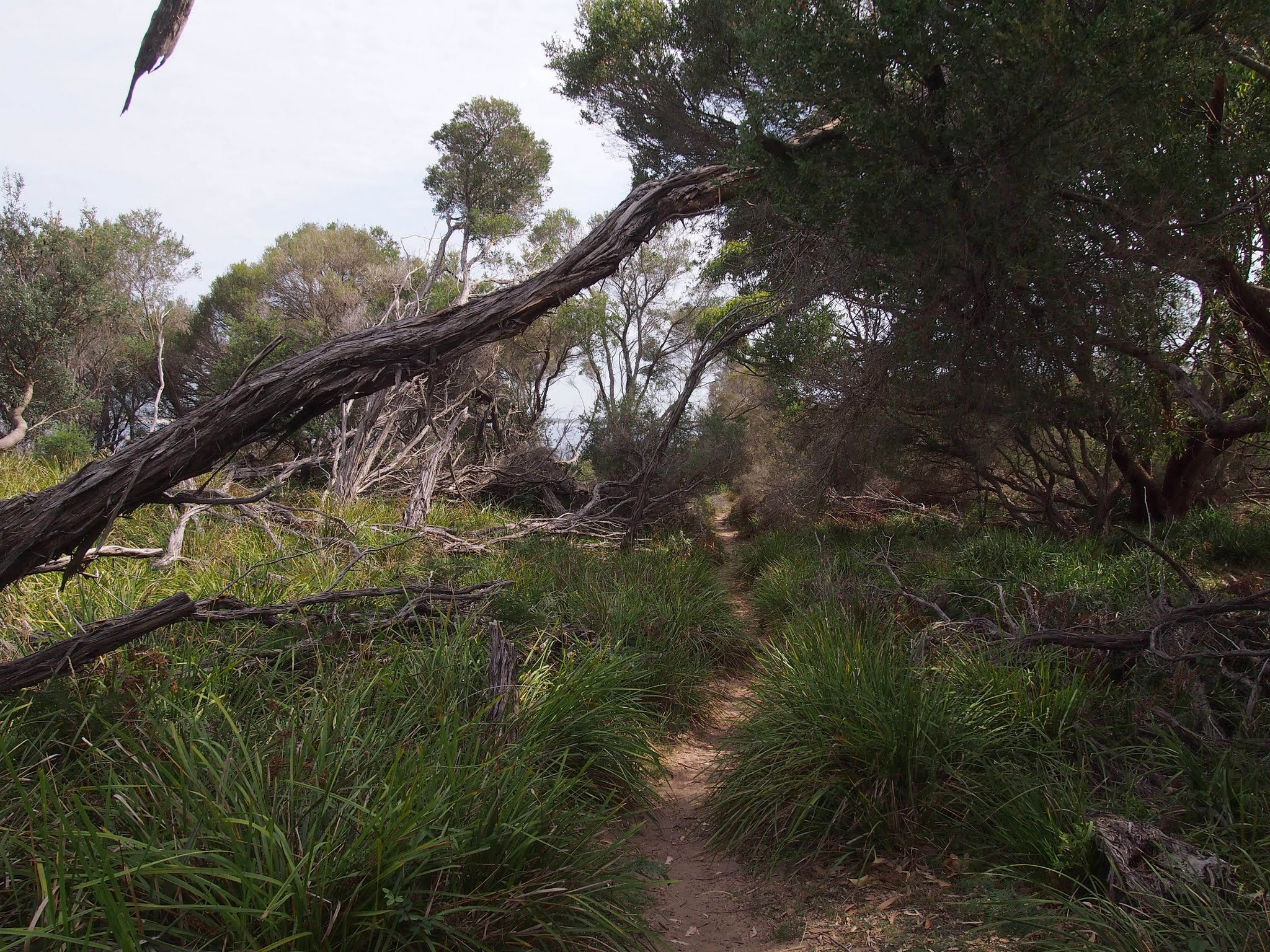
Jibbon Track (#2)

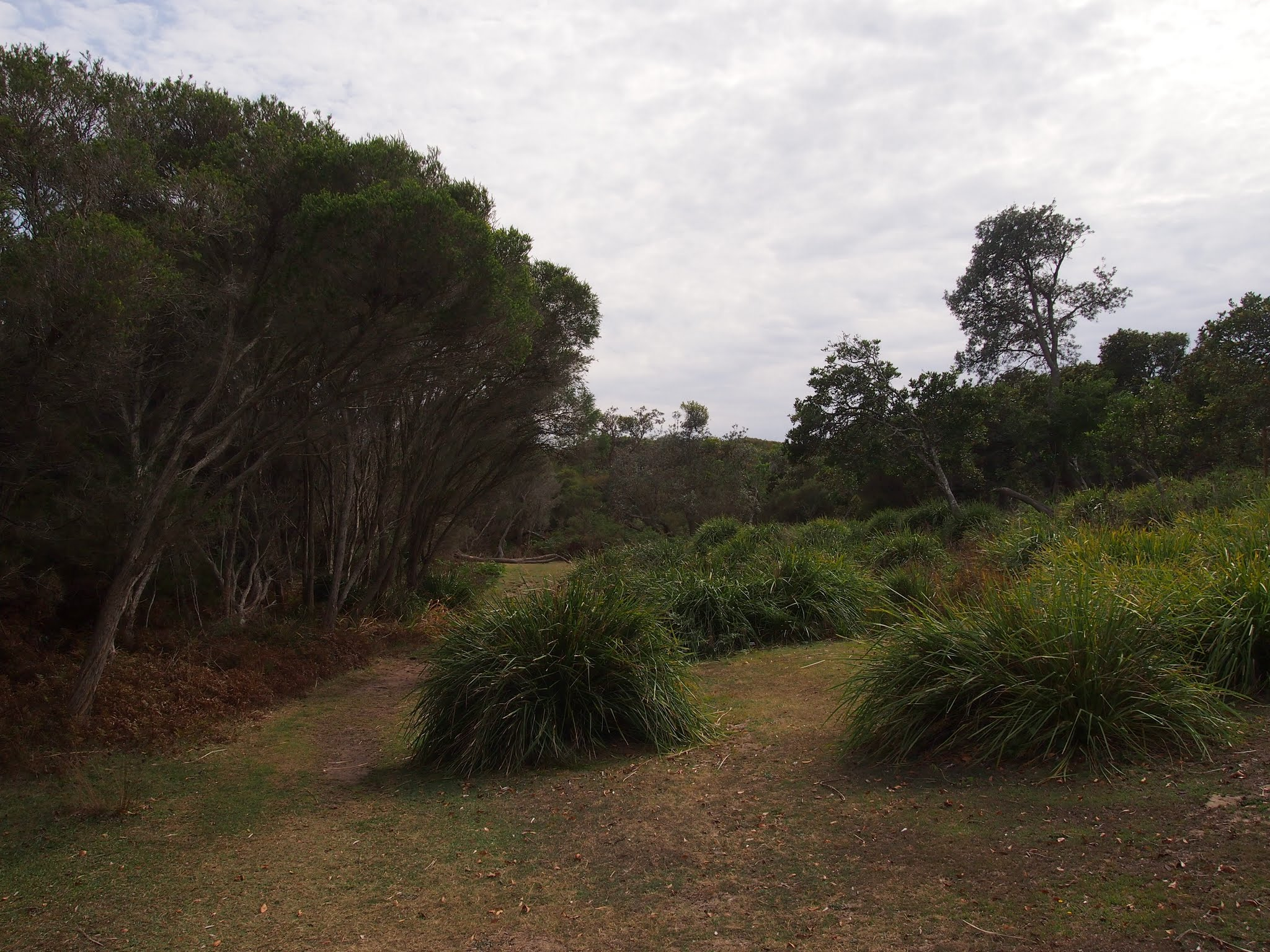
Jibbon Track (#3)

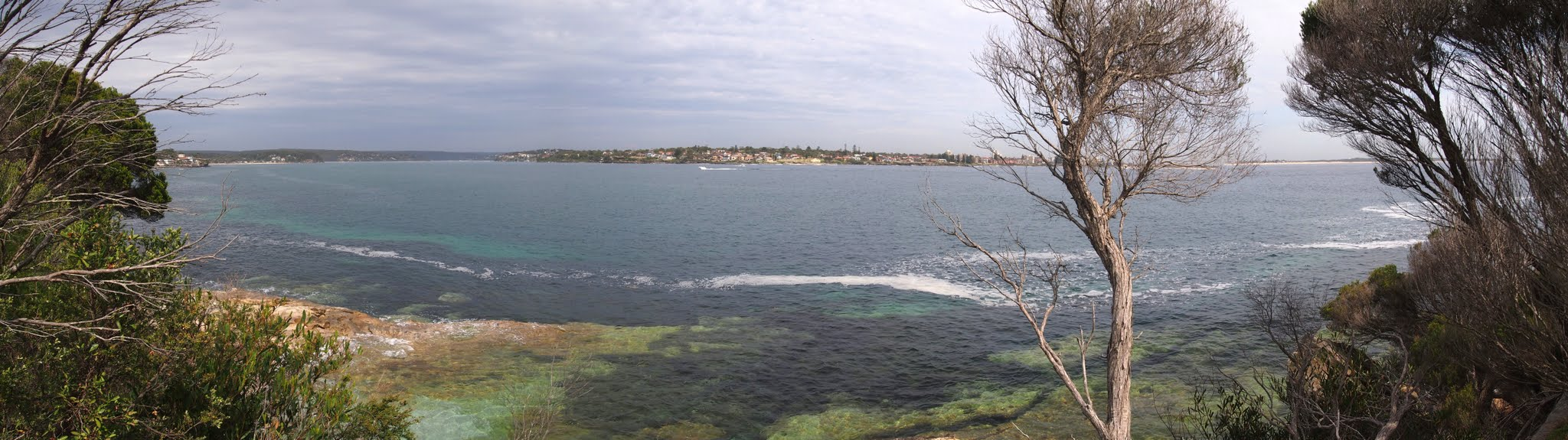
Jibbon Track (#4)

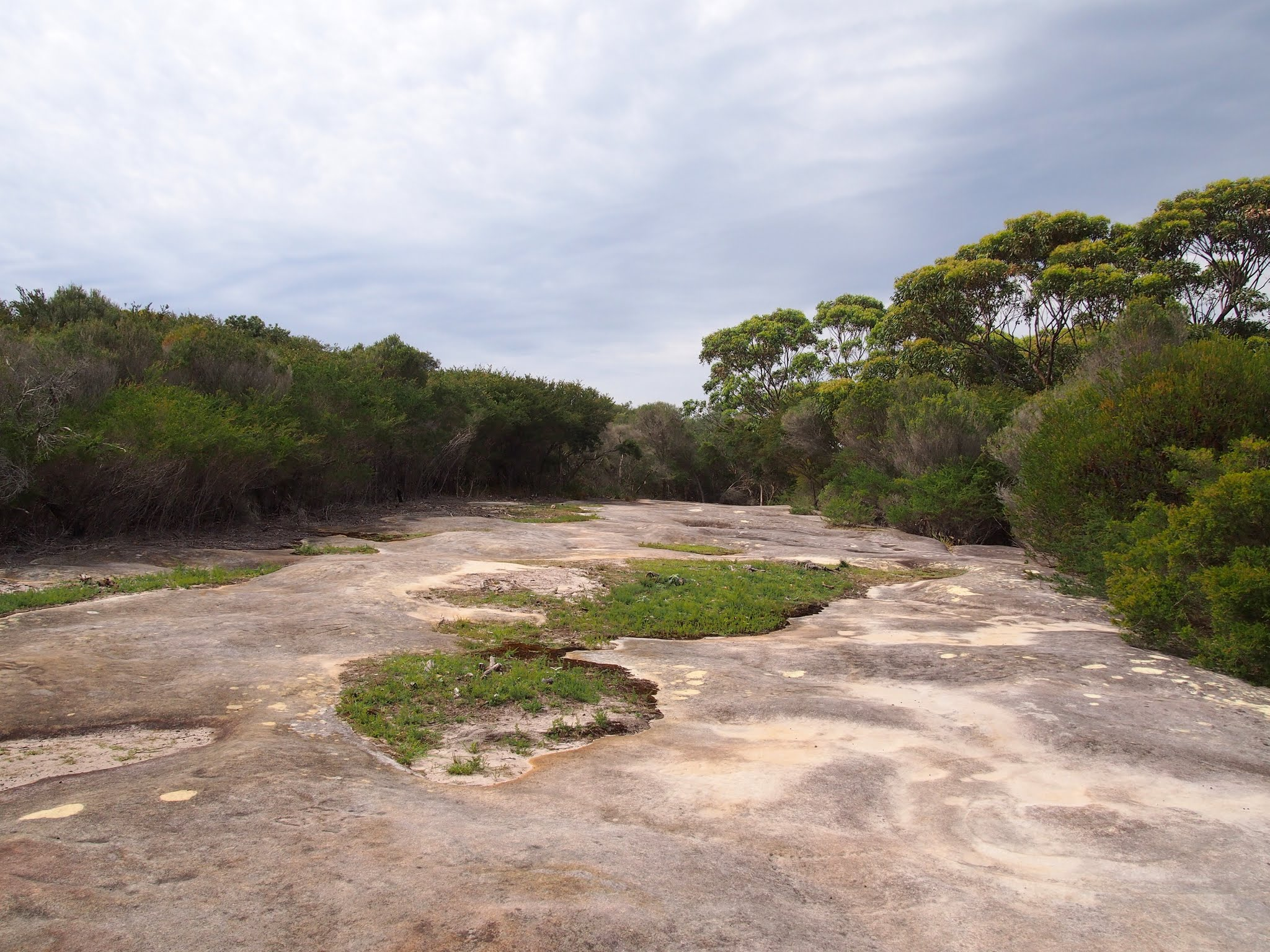
Jibbon Track (#5)

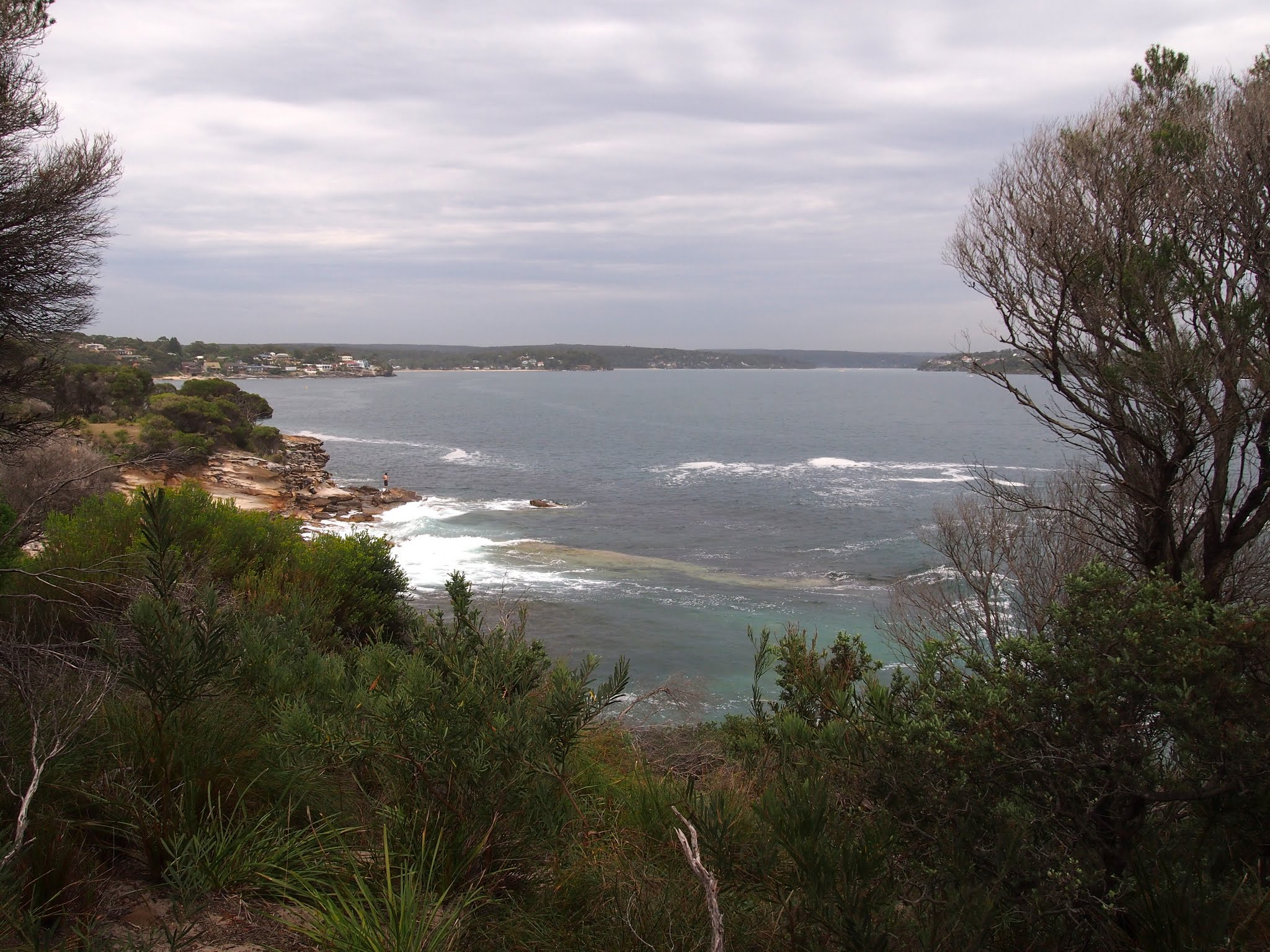
Jibbon Track (#6)

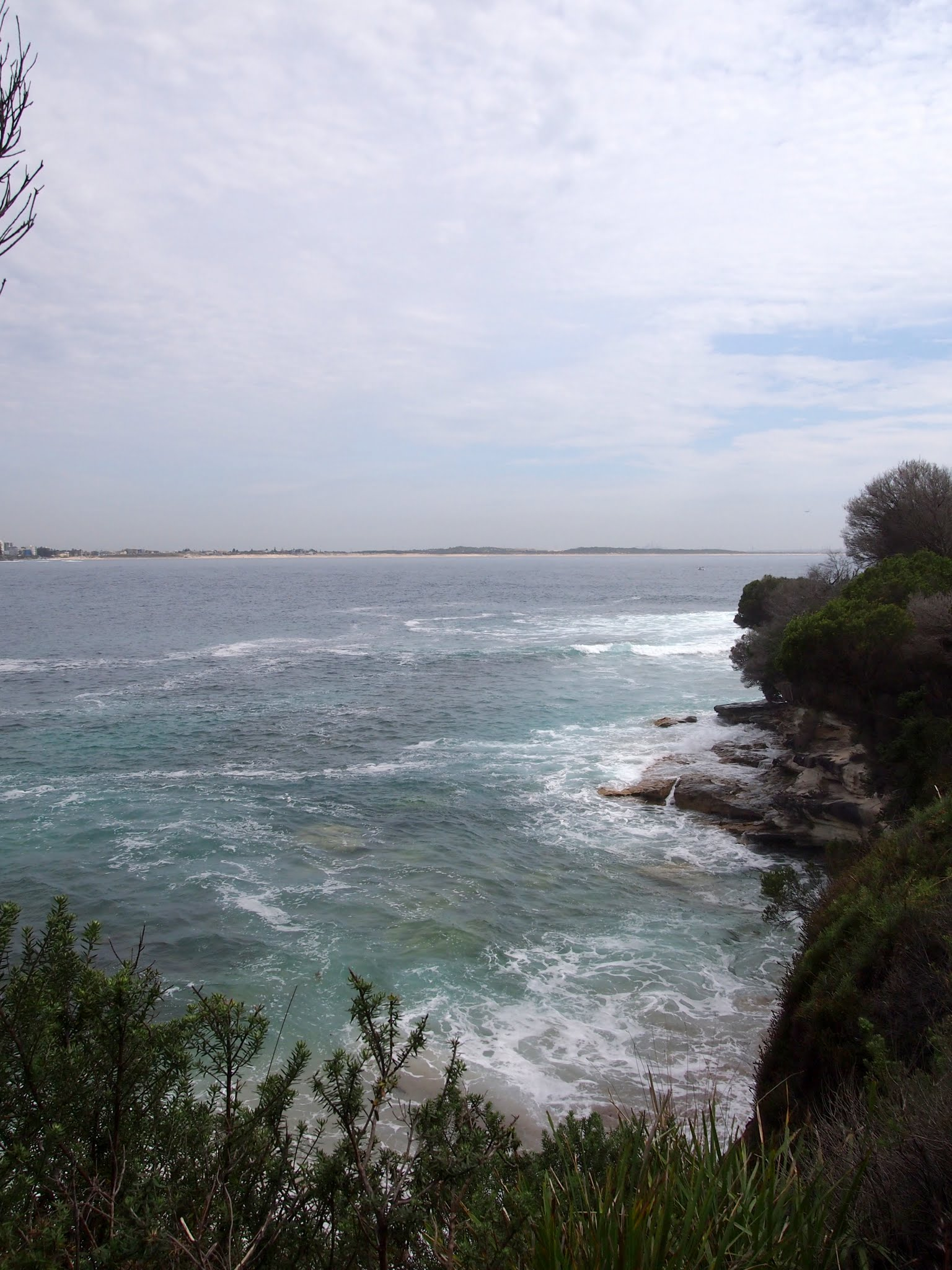
Jibbon Track (#7)

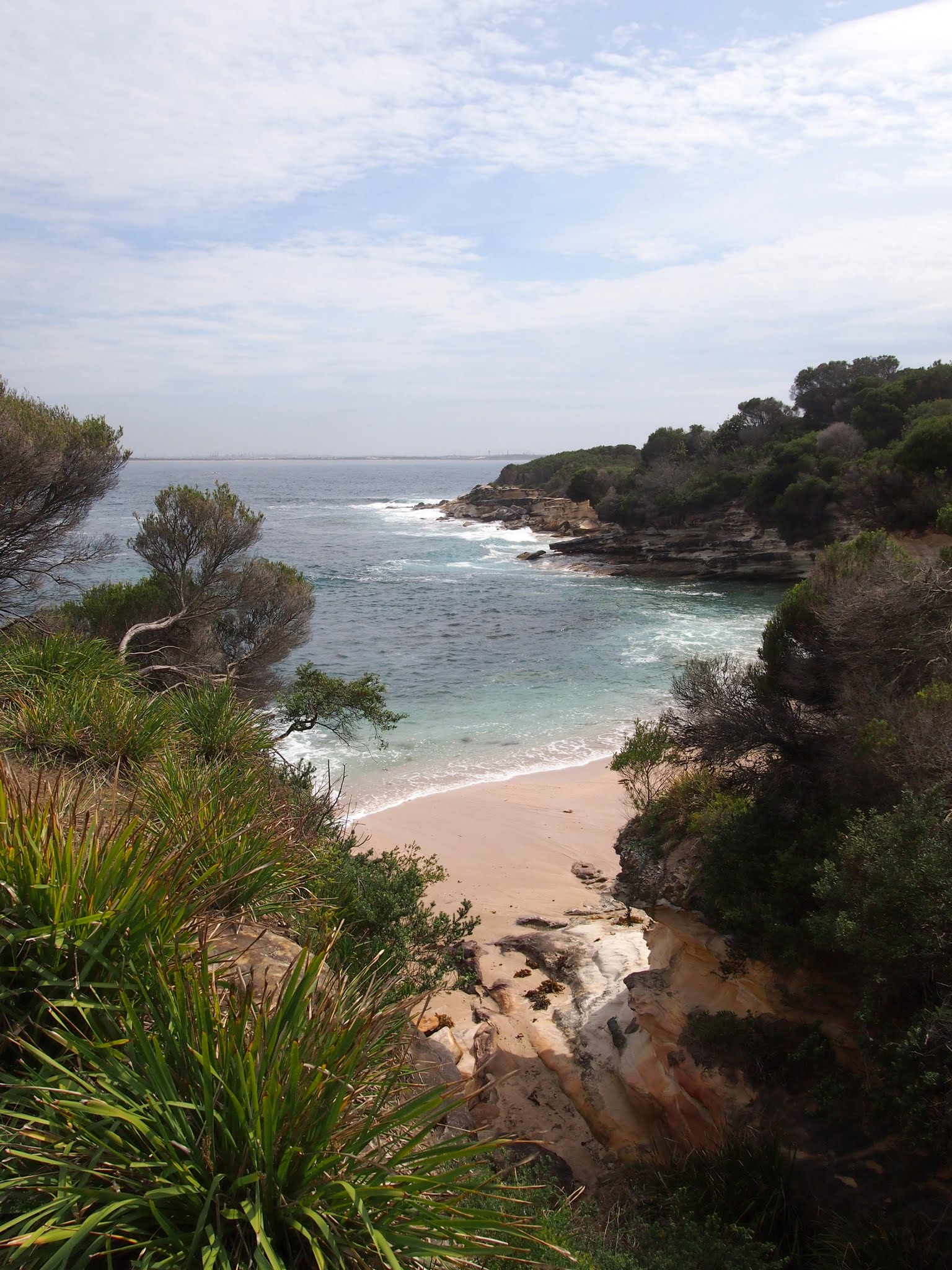
Jibbon Track (#8)

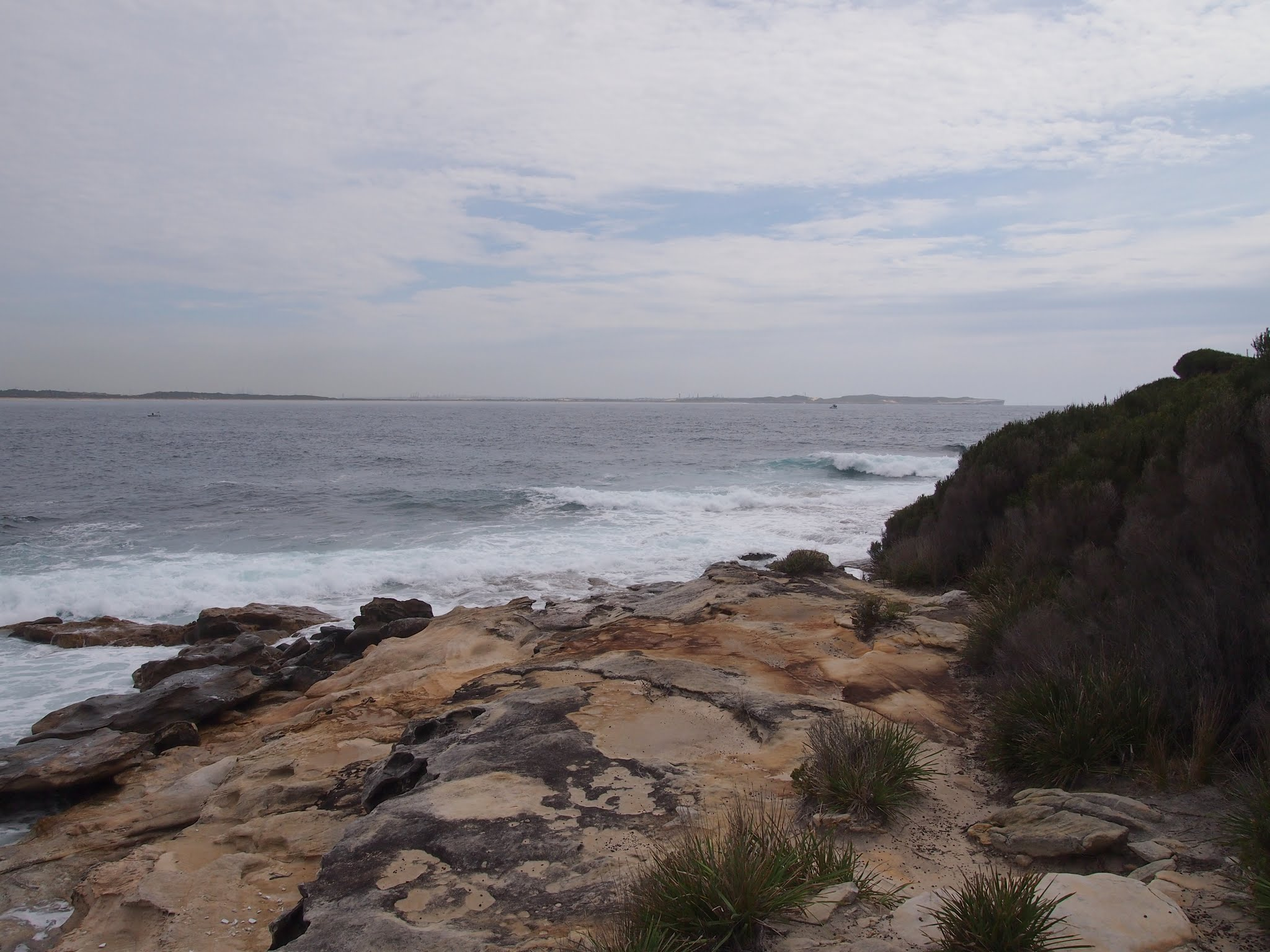
Jibbon Track (#9)

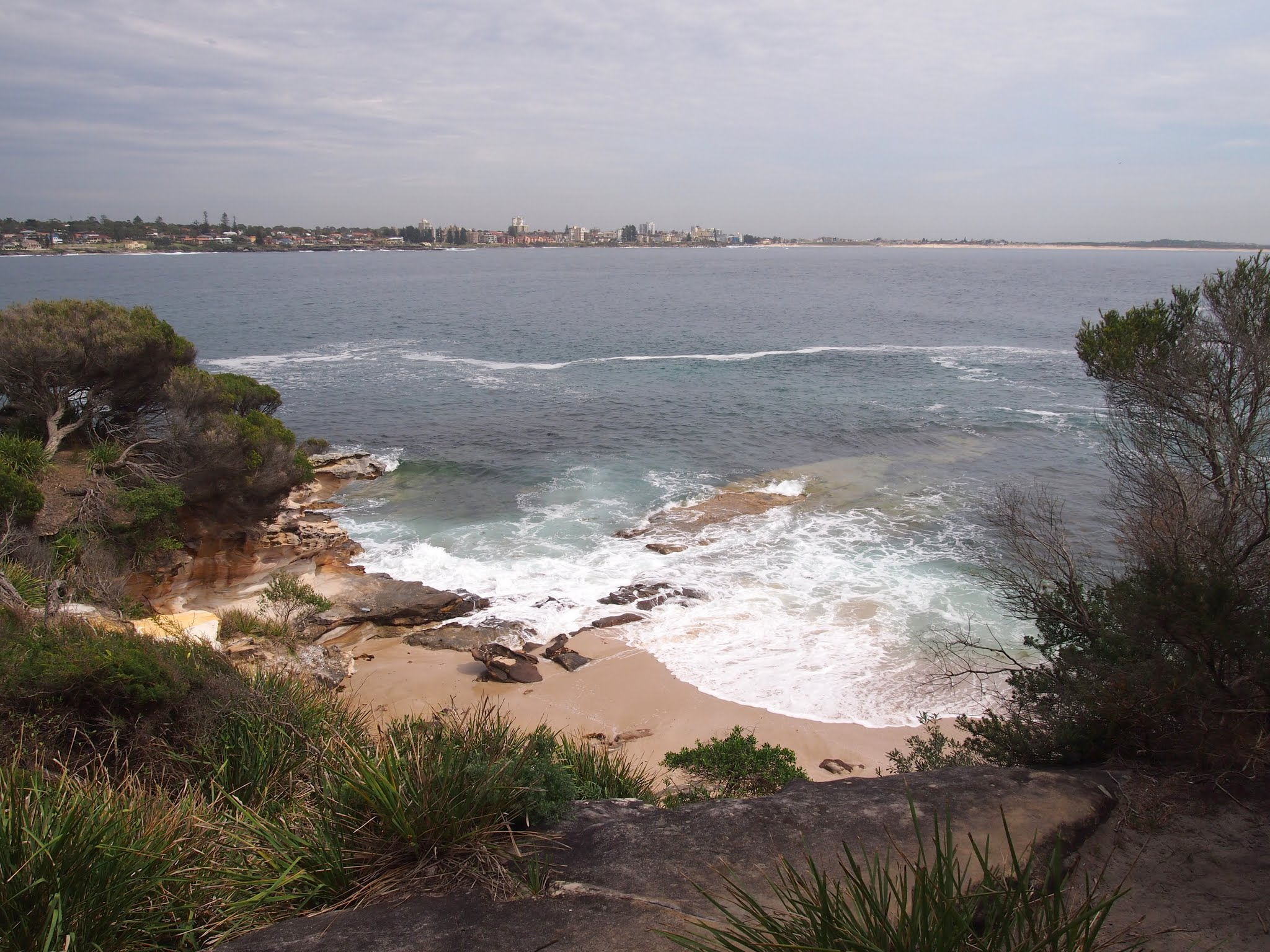
Jibbon Track (#10)

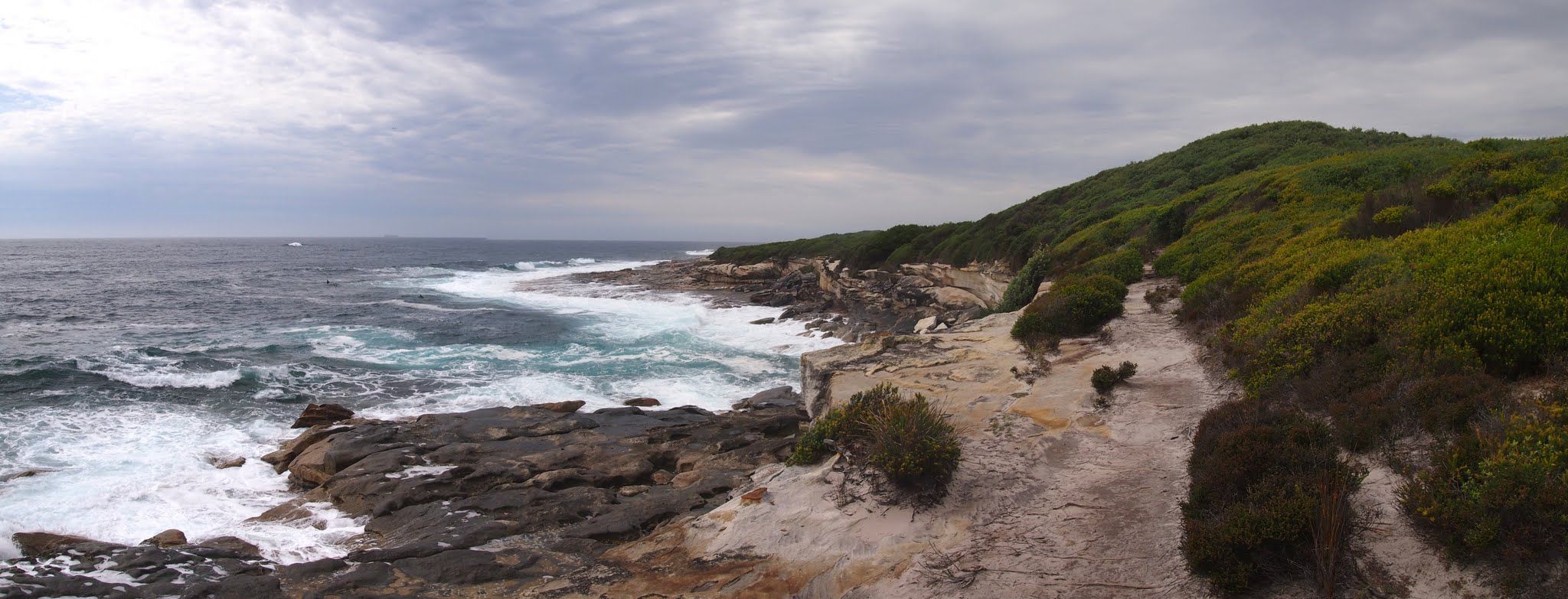
Jibbon Track (#11)

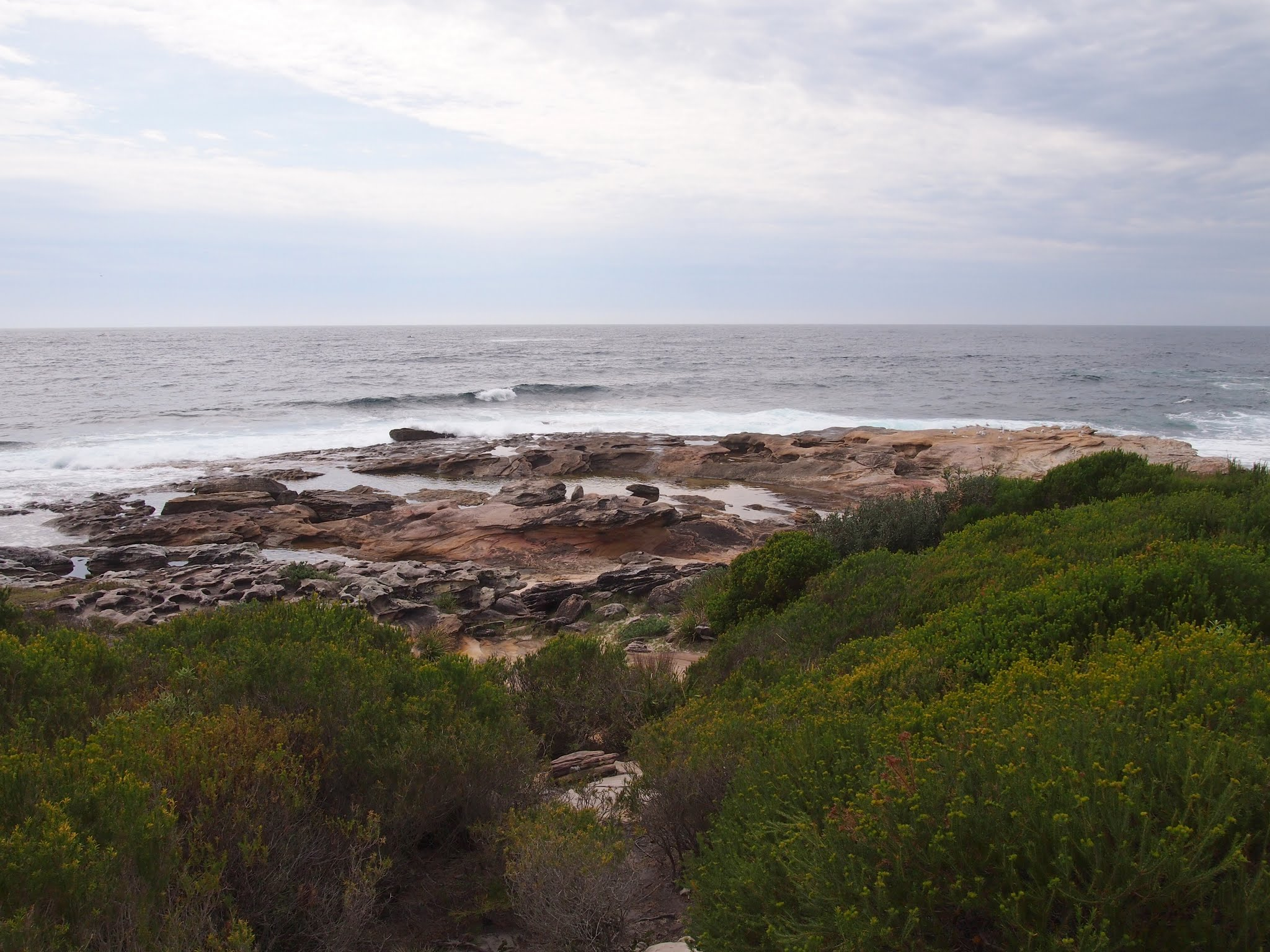
Jibbon Track (#12)

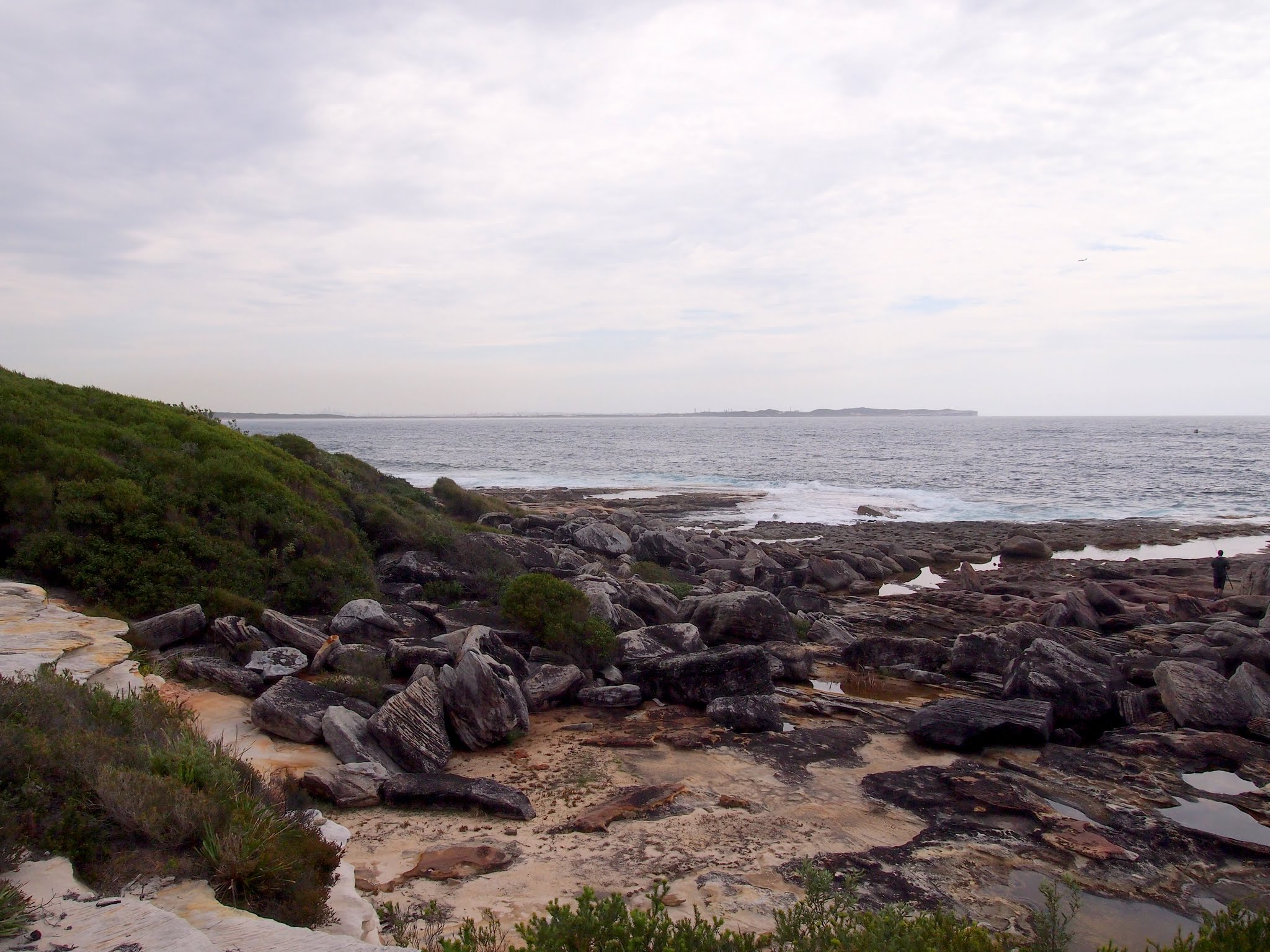
Coast Track (#1)

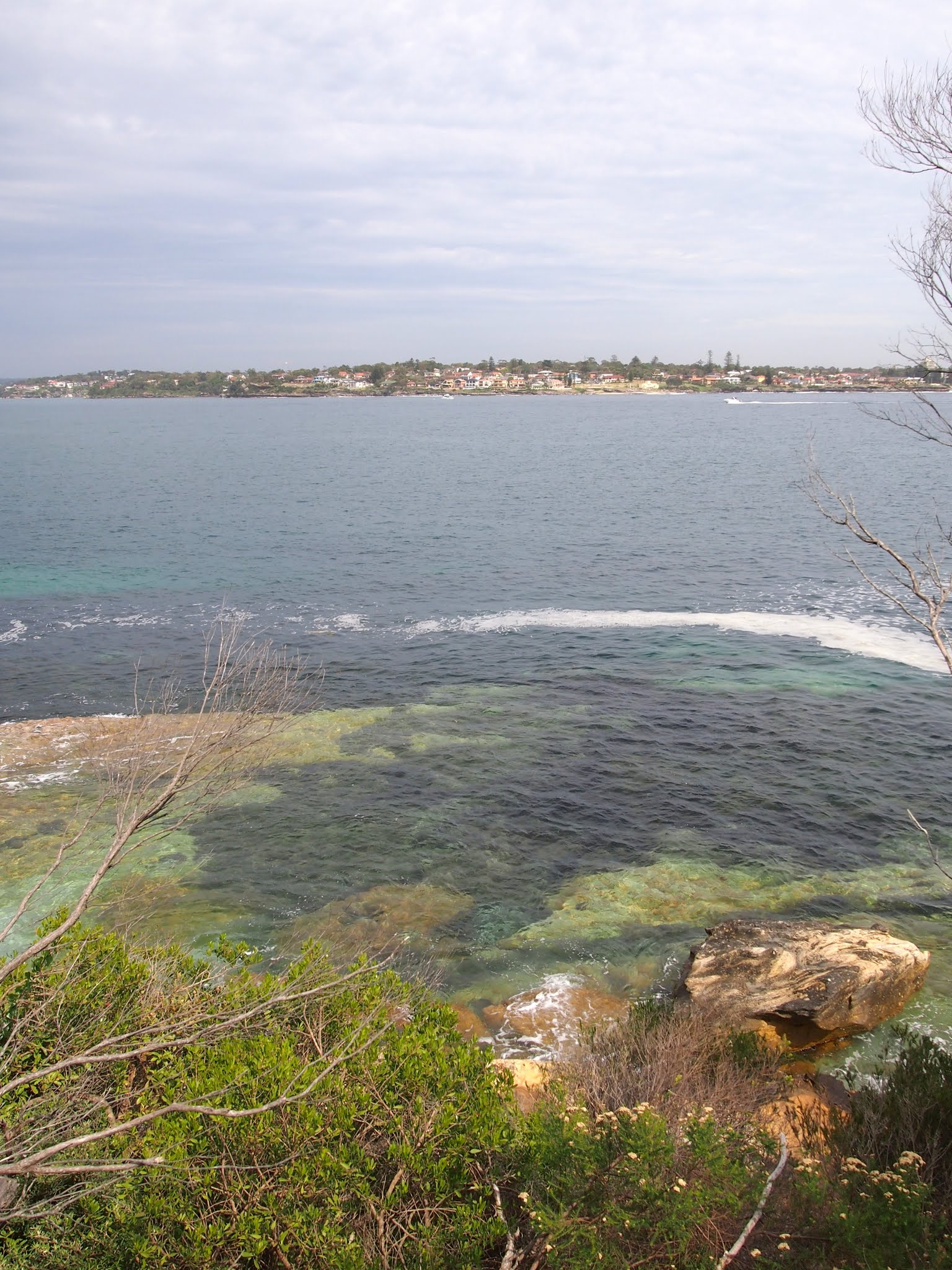
Jibbon Track (#13)

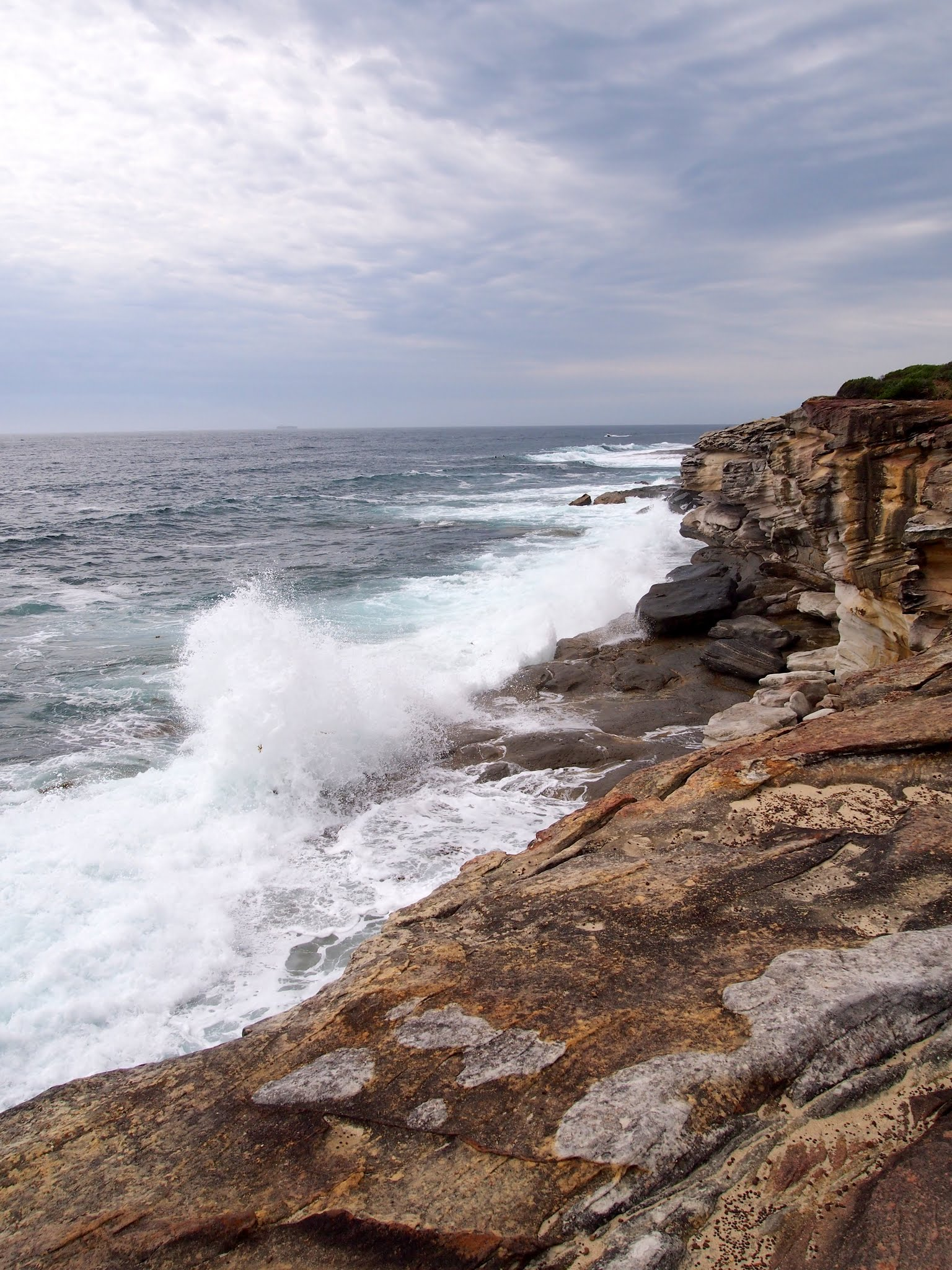
Jibbon Track (#14)

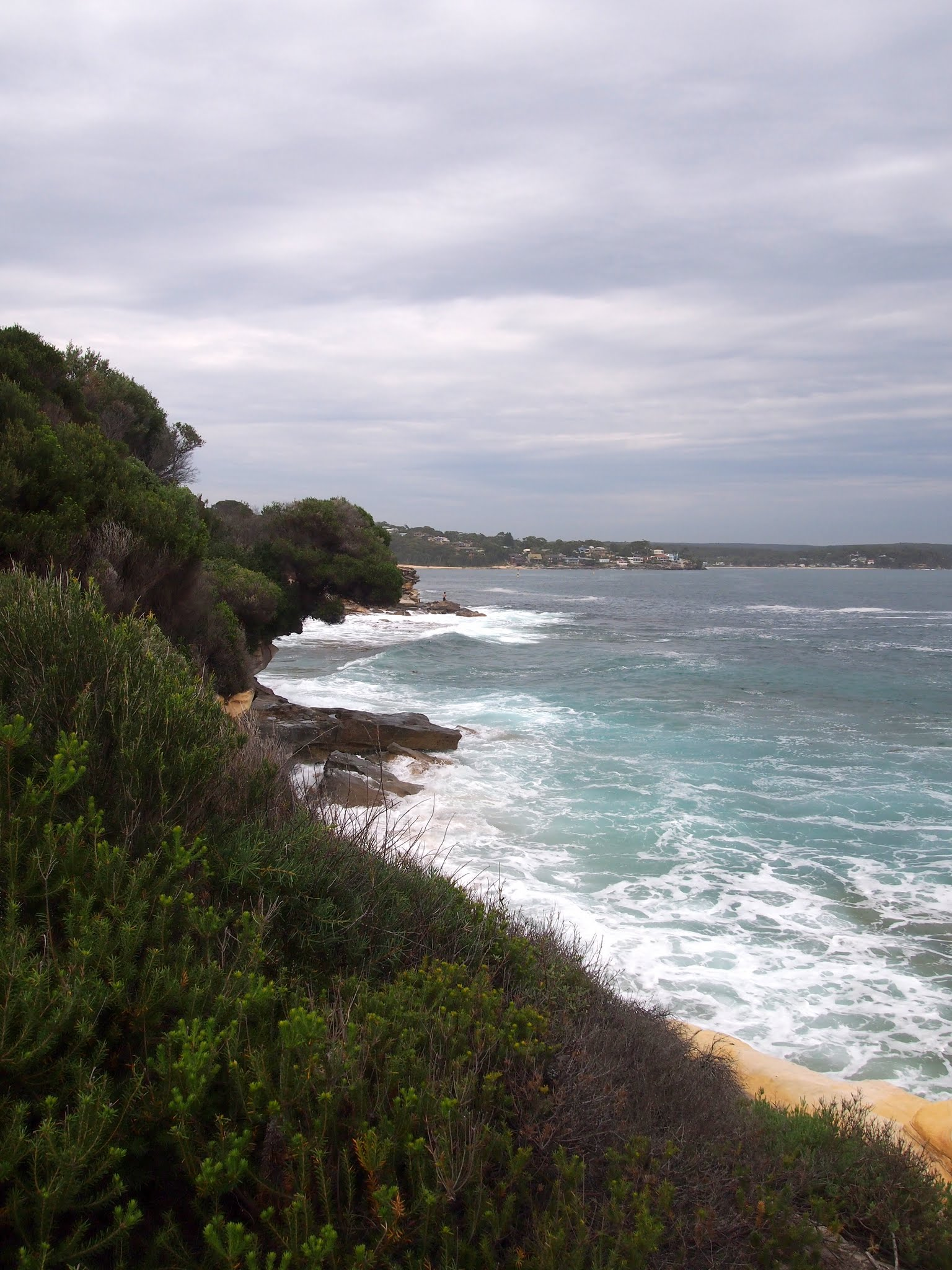
Jibbon Track (#15)

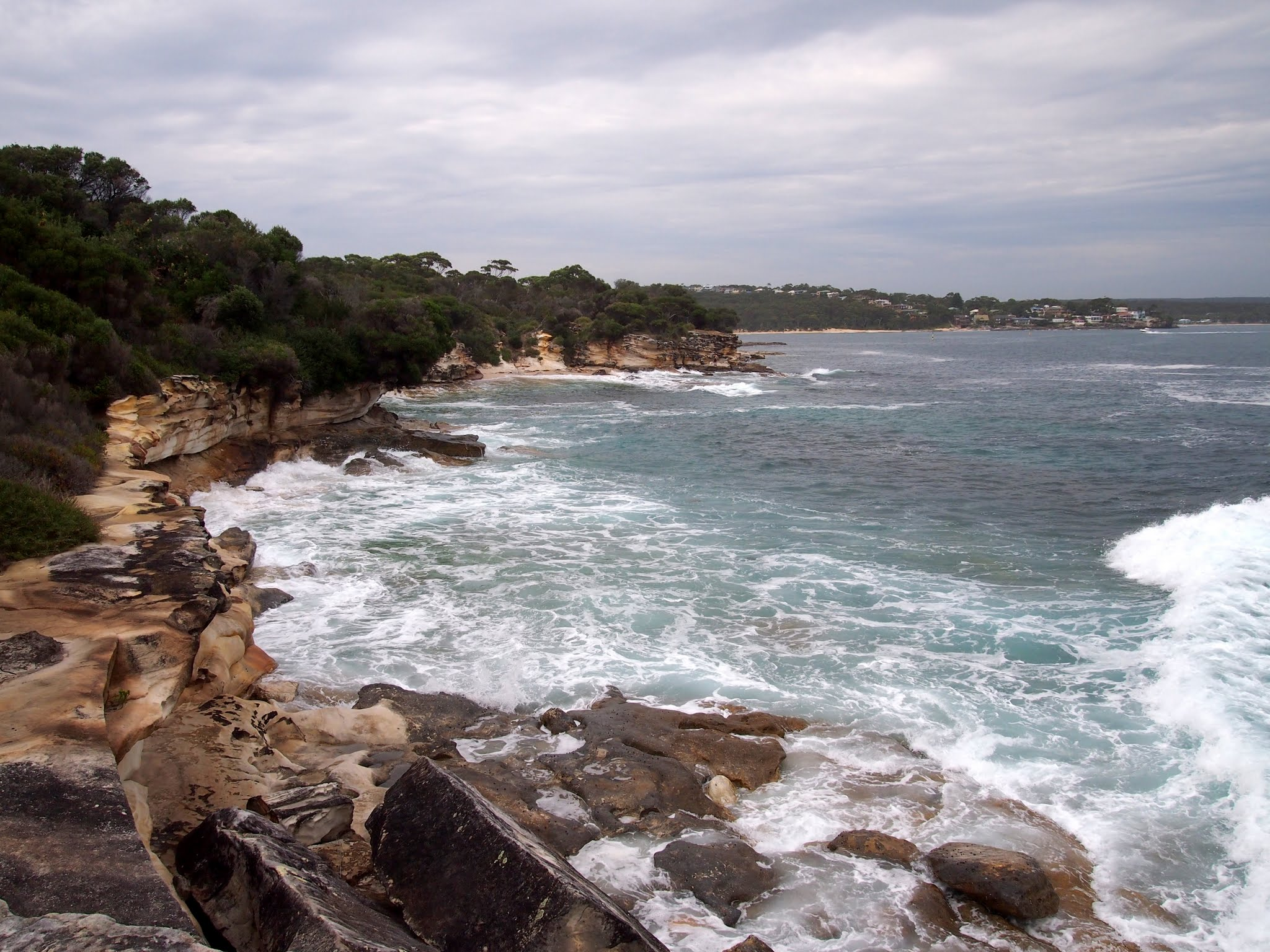
Jibbon Track (#16)

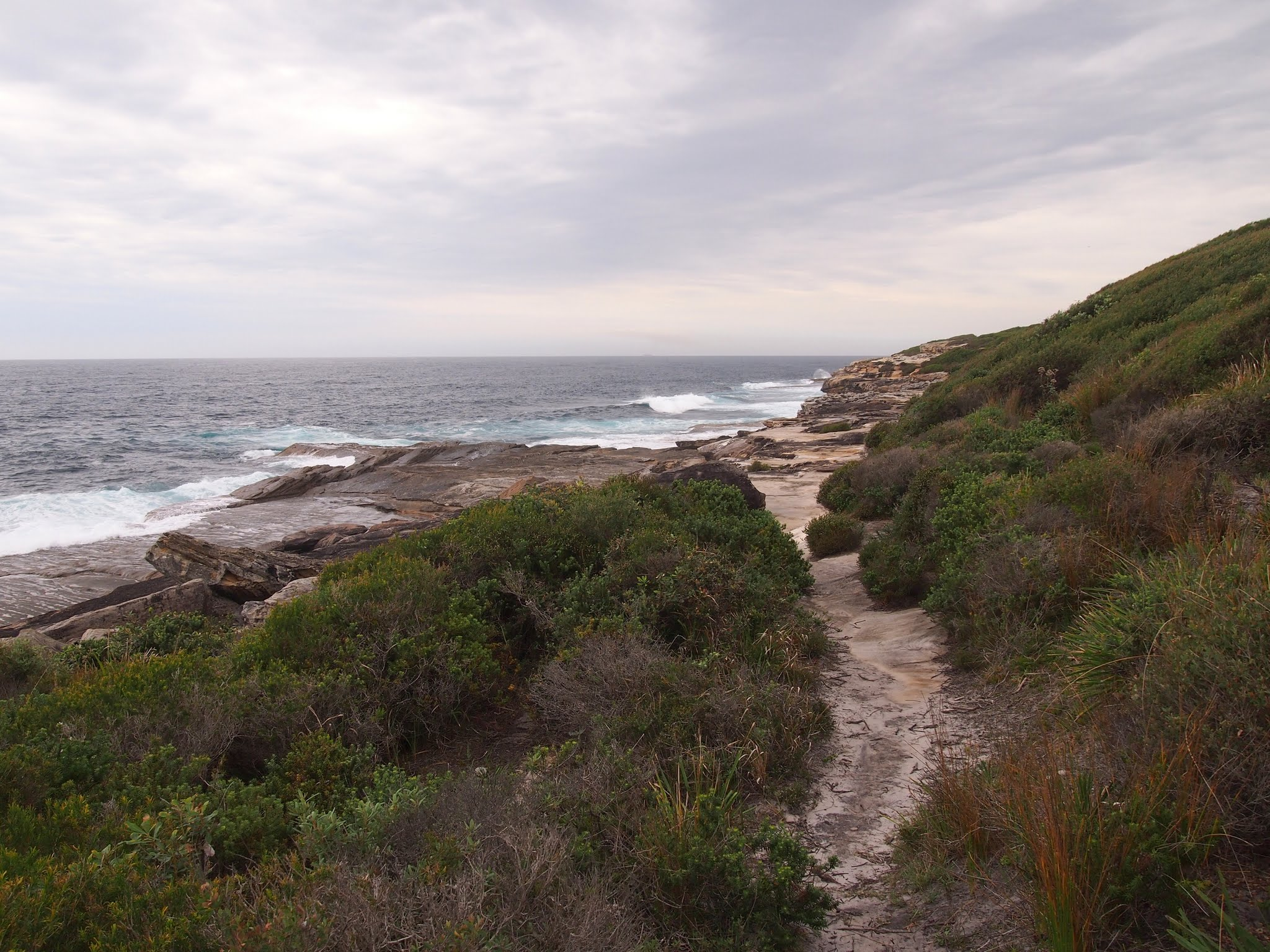
Coast Track (#2)

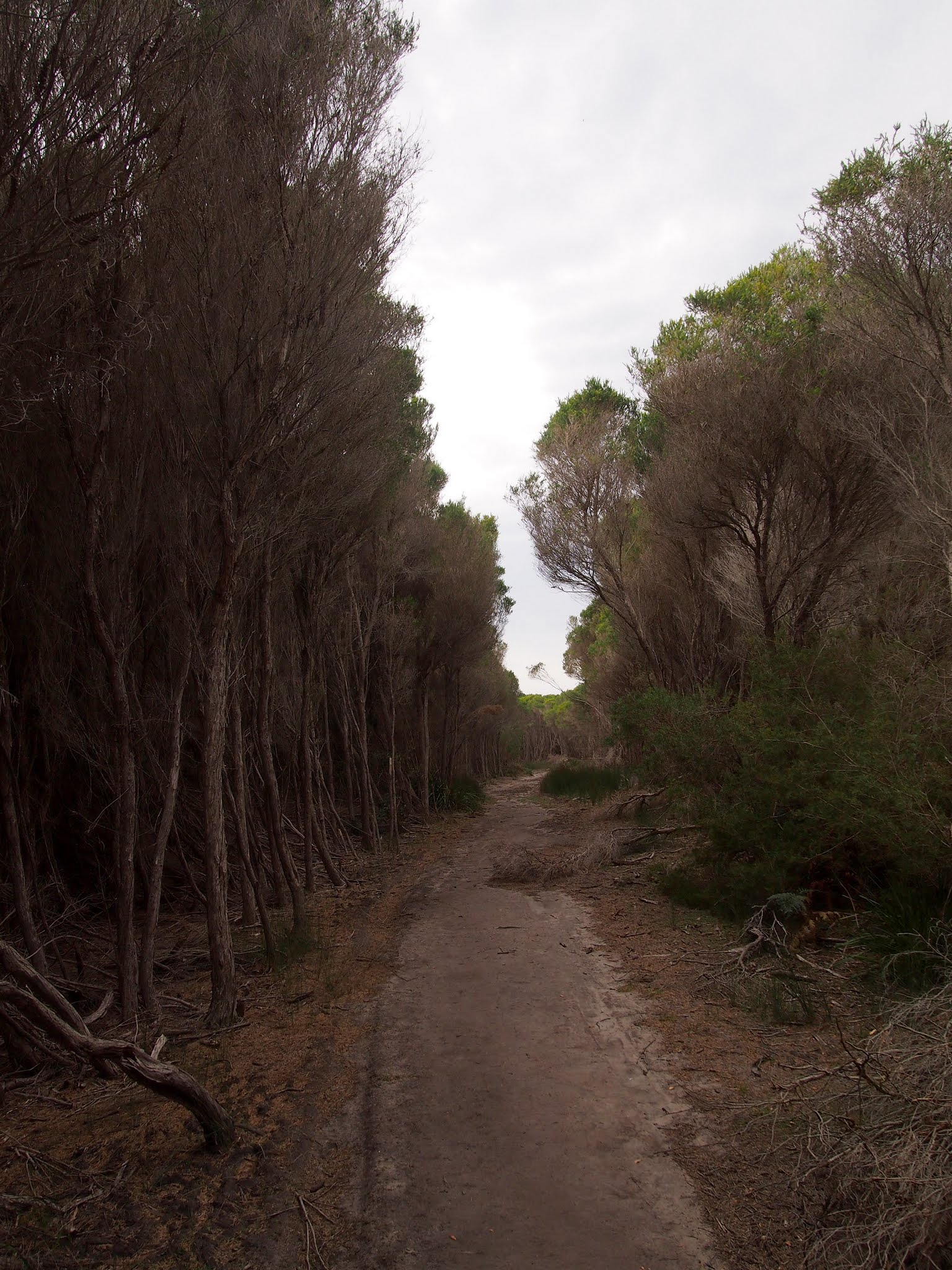
Coast Track (#3)

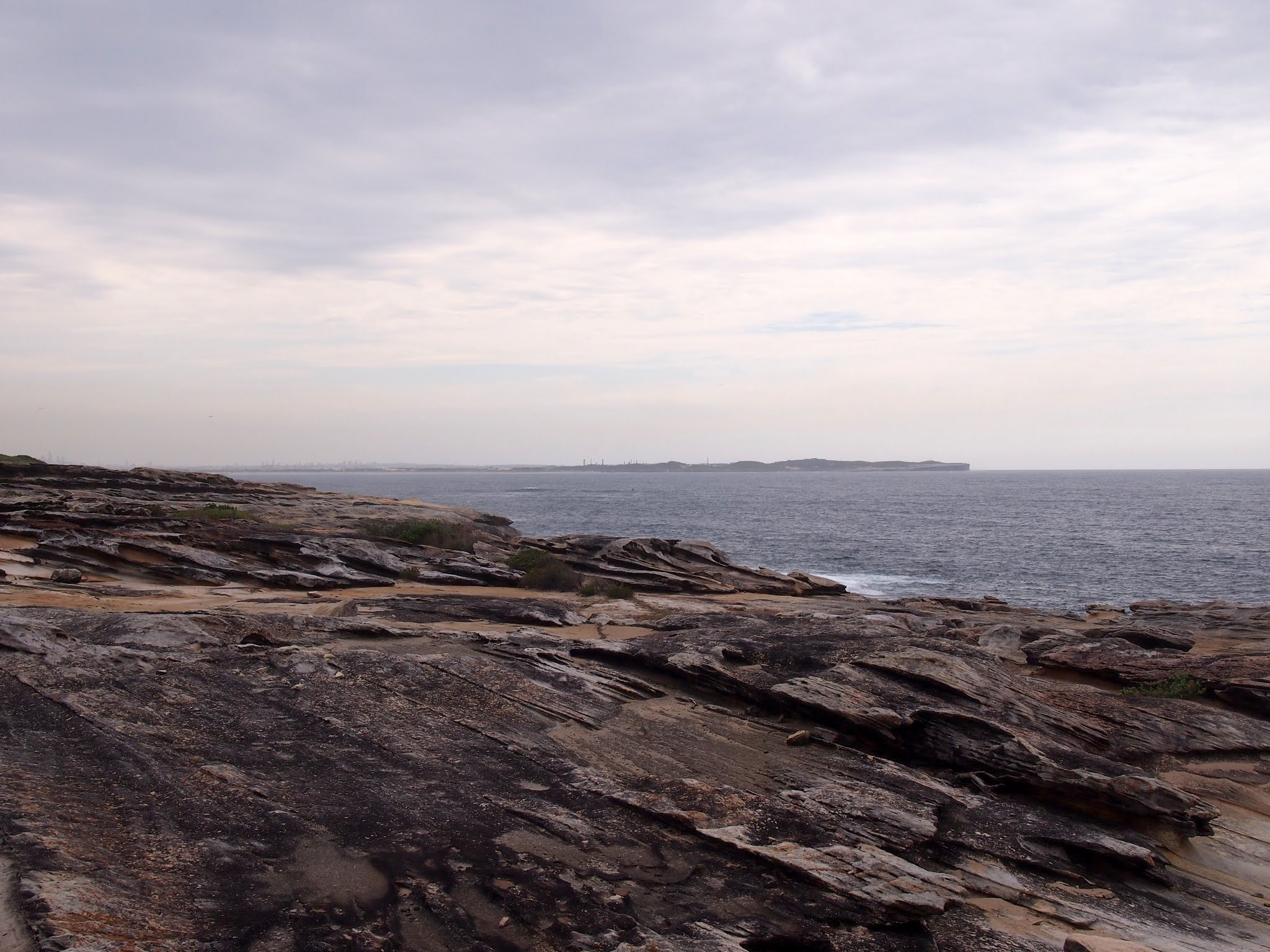
Coast Track (#4)

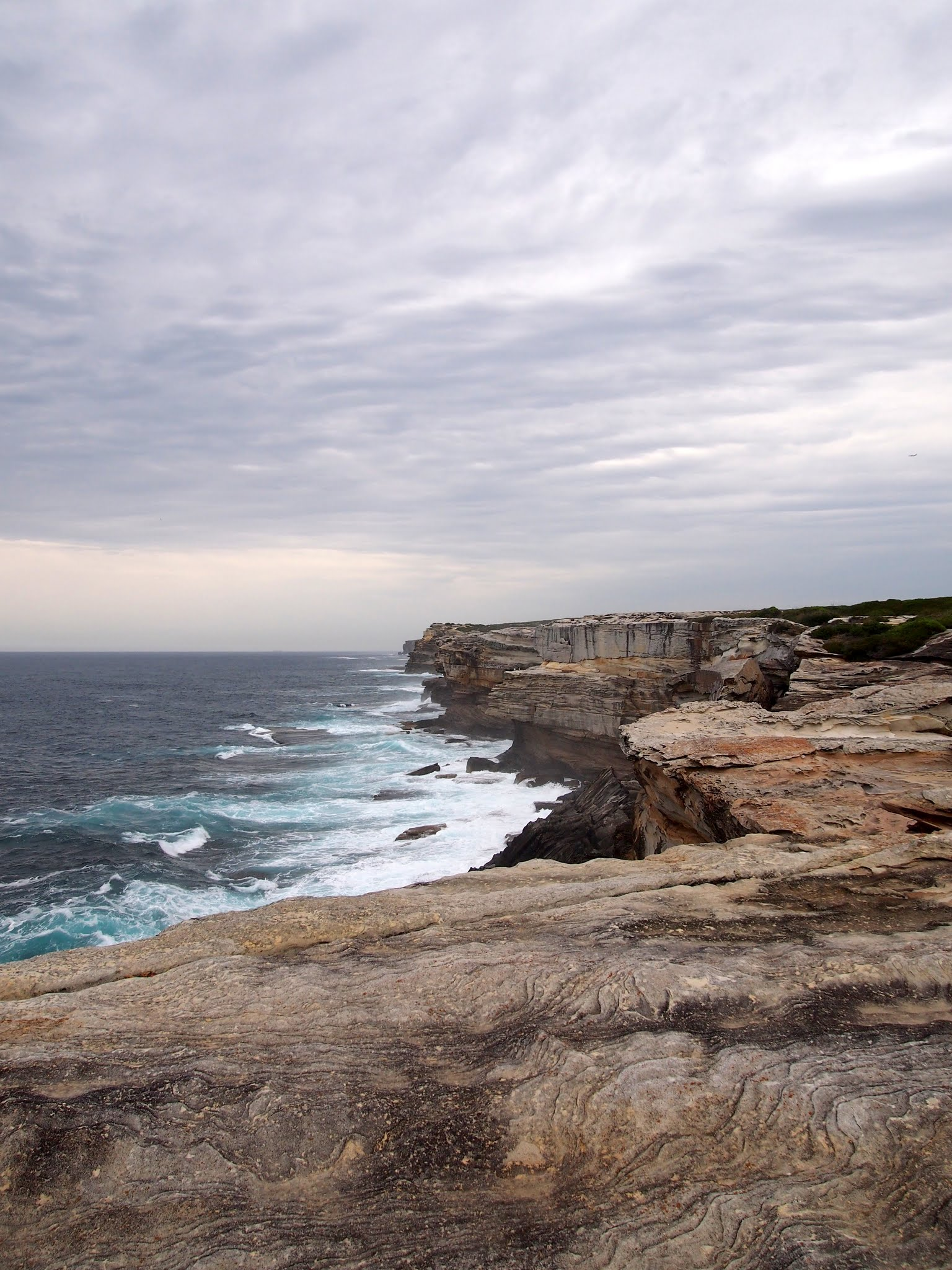
Coast Track (#5)

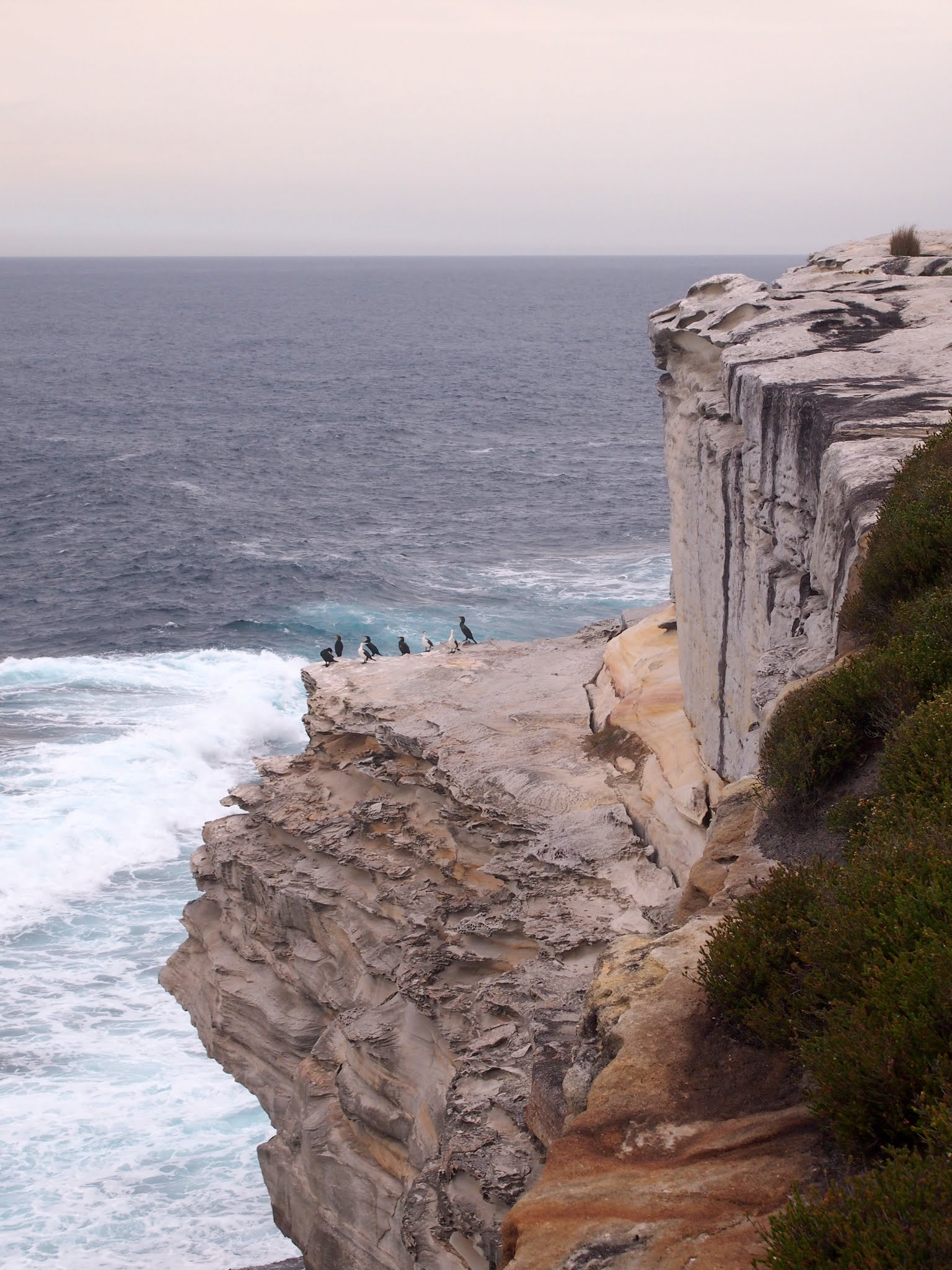
Coast Track (#6)

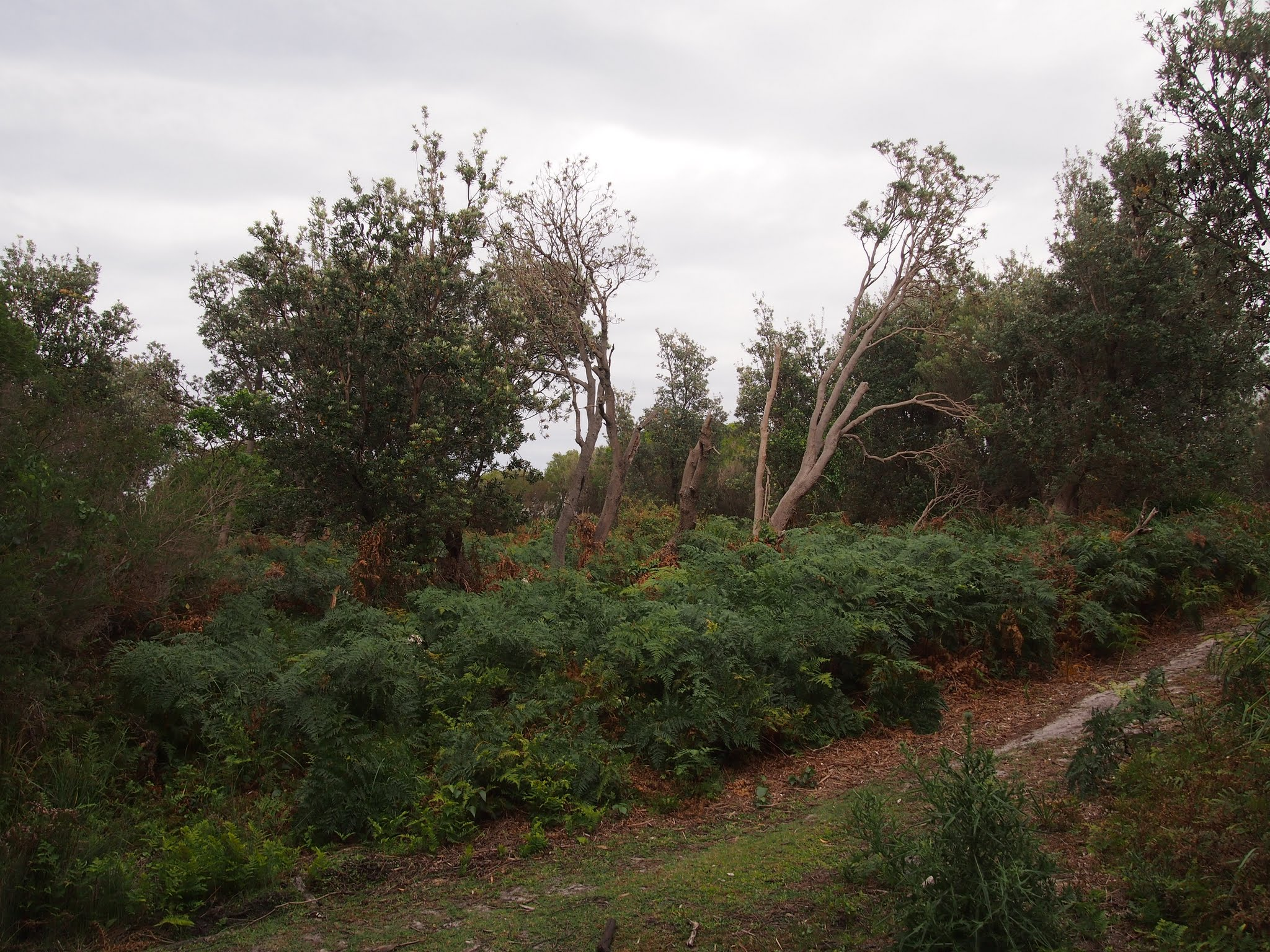
Coast Track (#7)

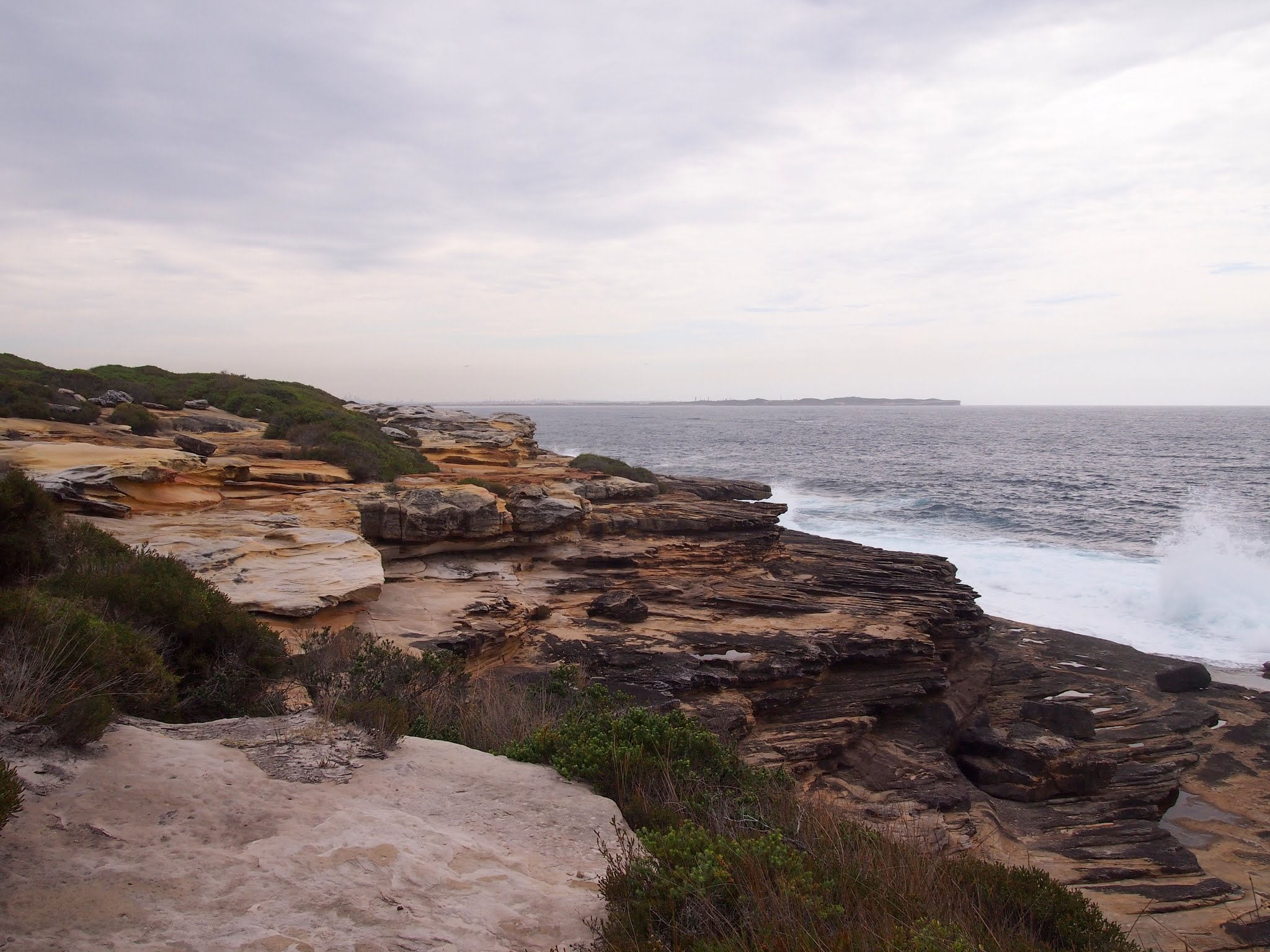
Coast Track (#8)

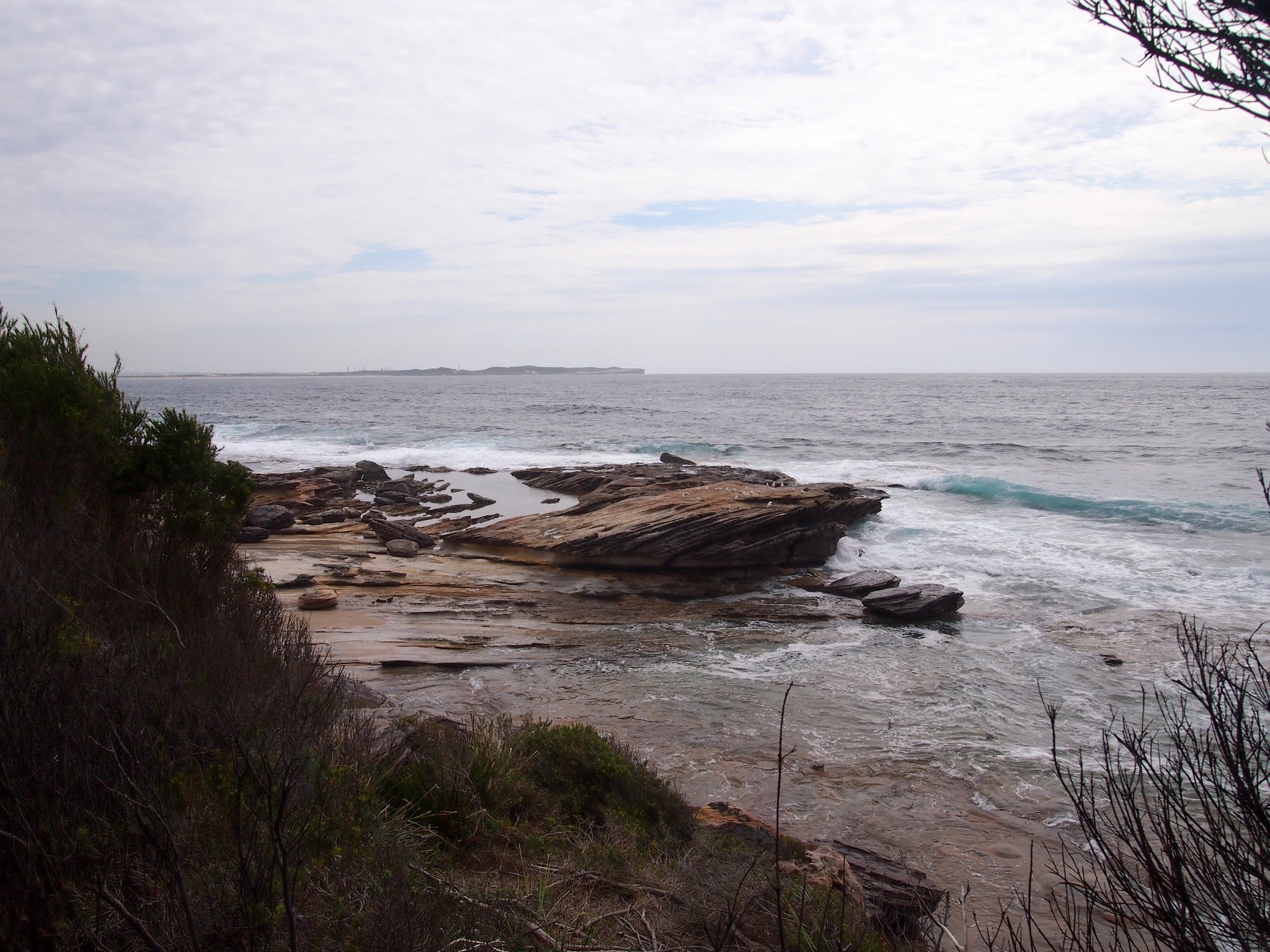
Jibbon Track (#17)

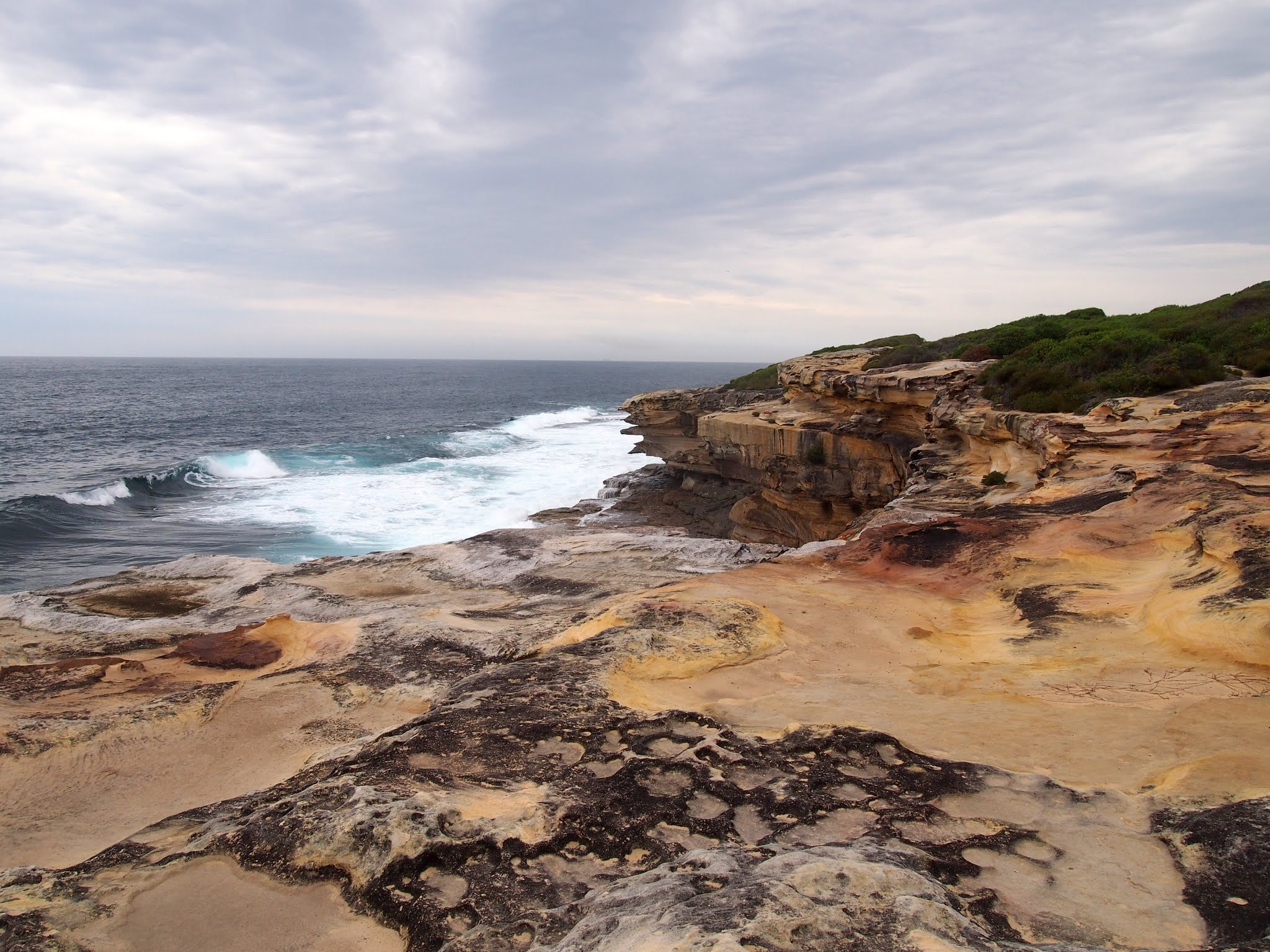
Coast Track (#9)

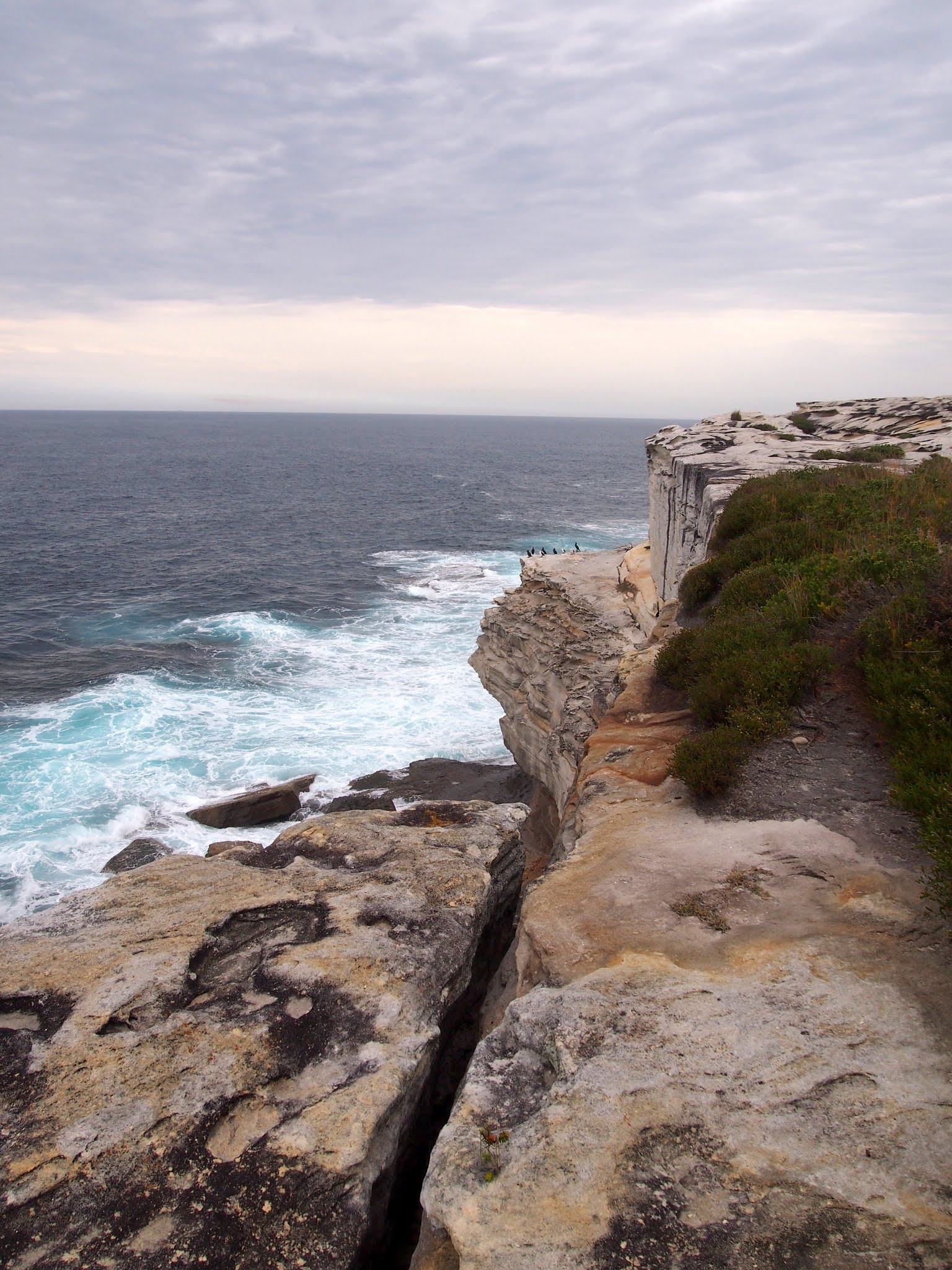
Coast Track (#10)

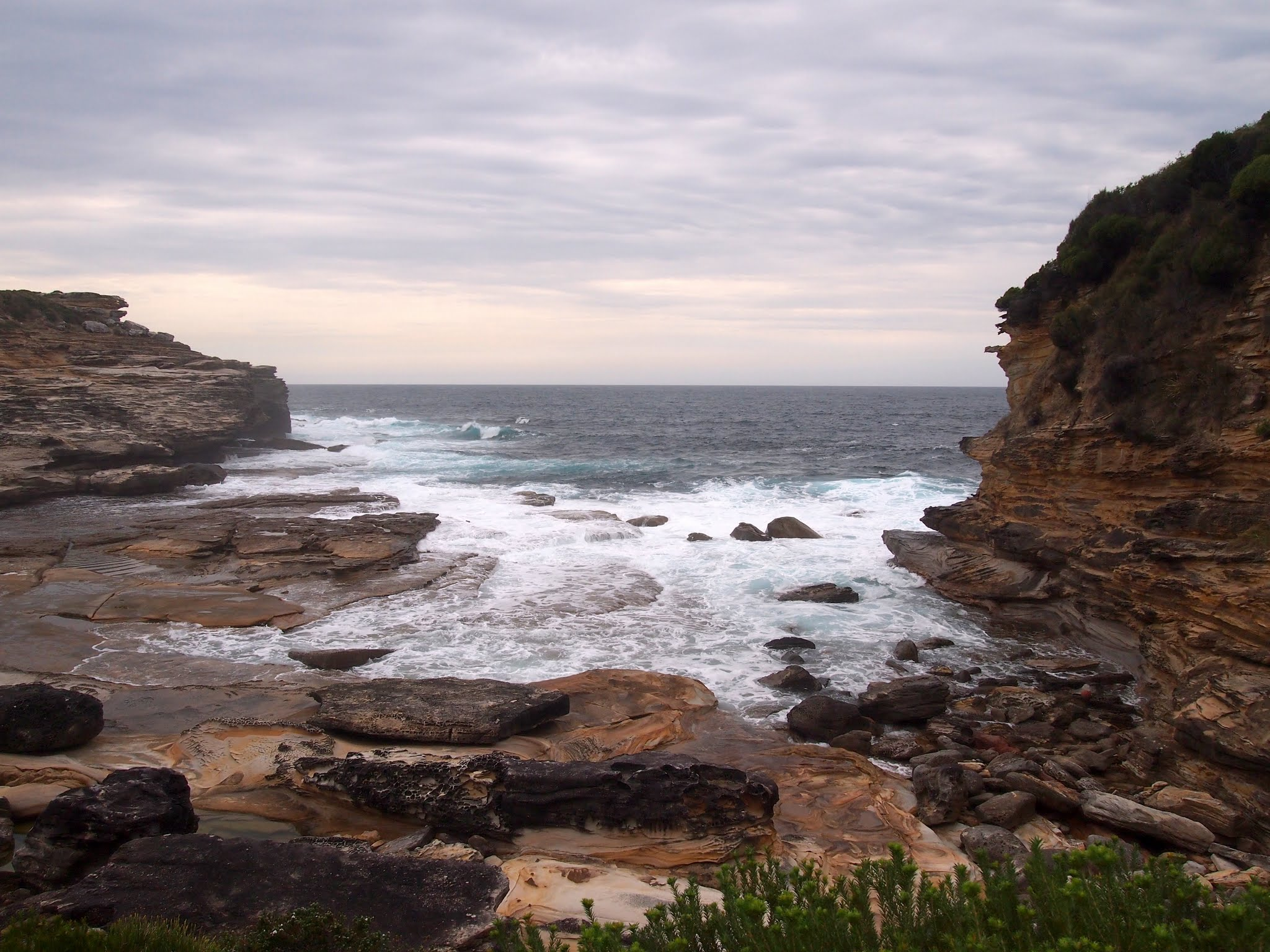
Coast Track (#11)

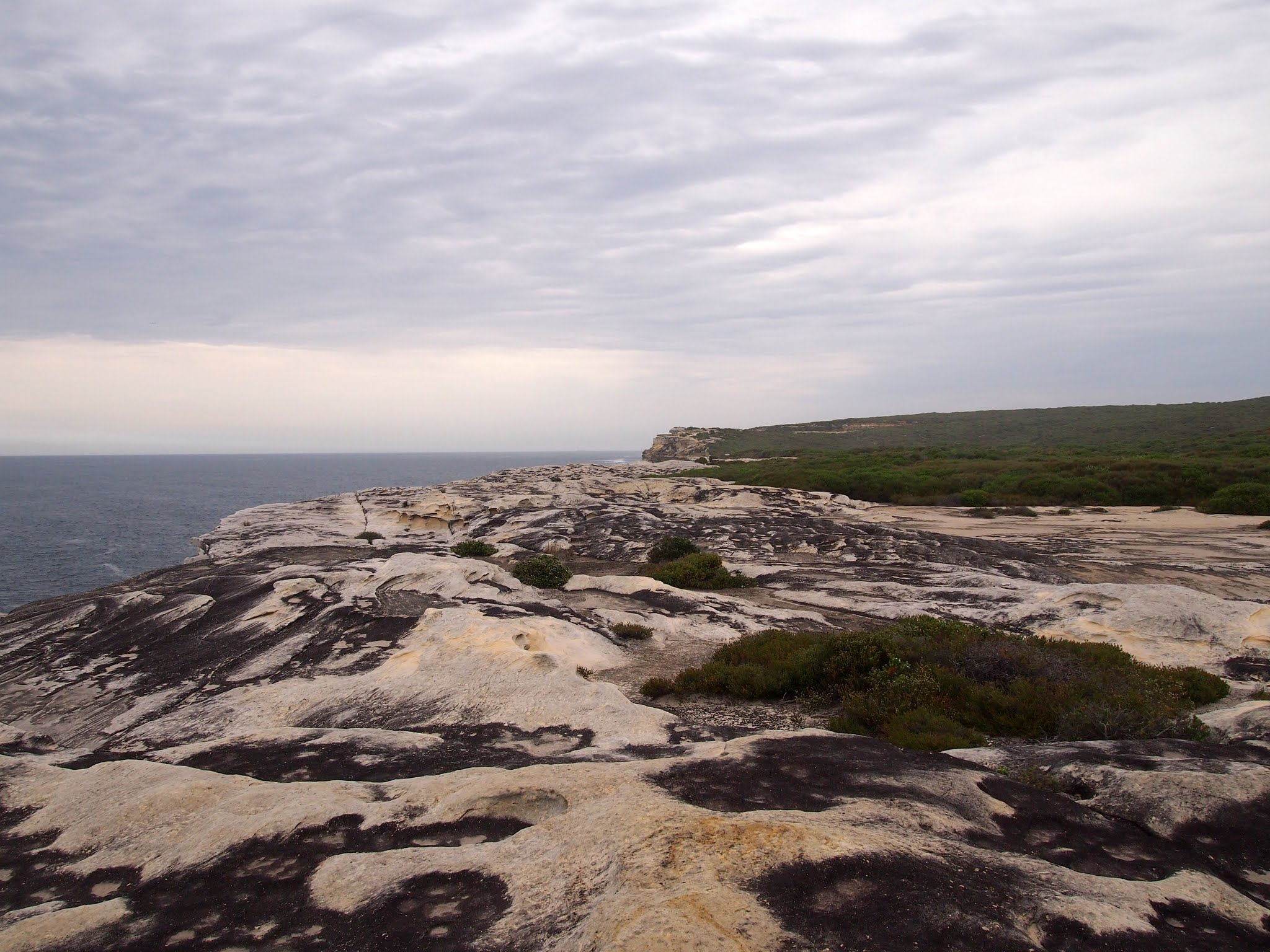
Coast Track (#12)

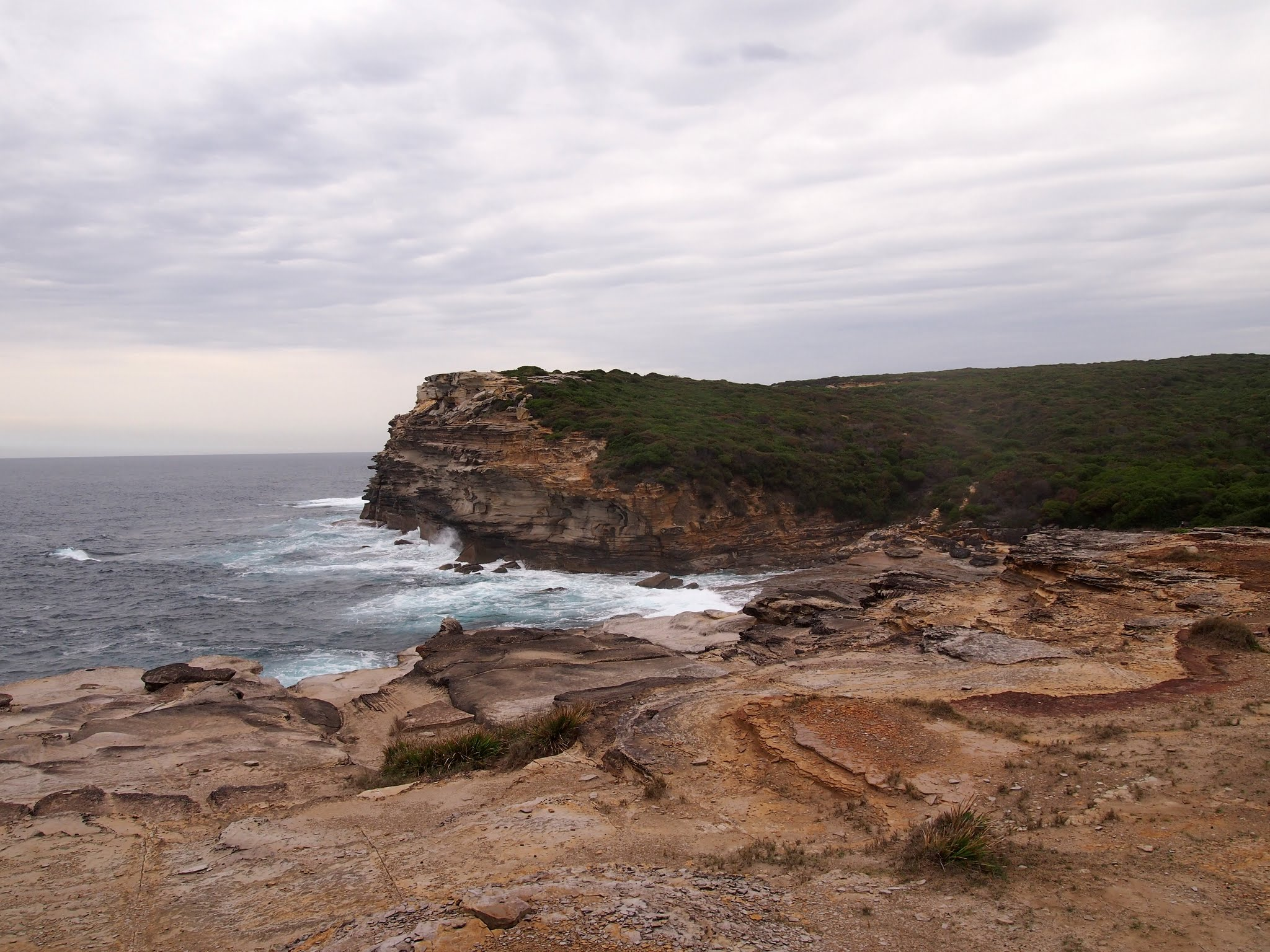
Coast Track (#13)

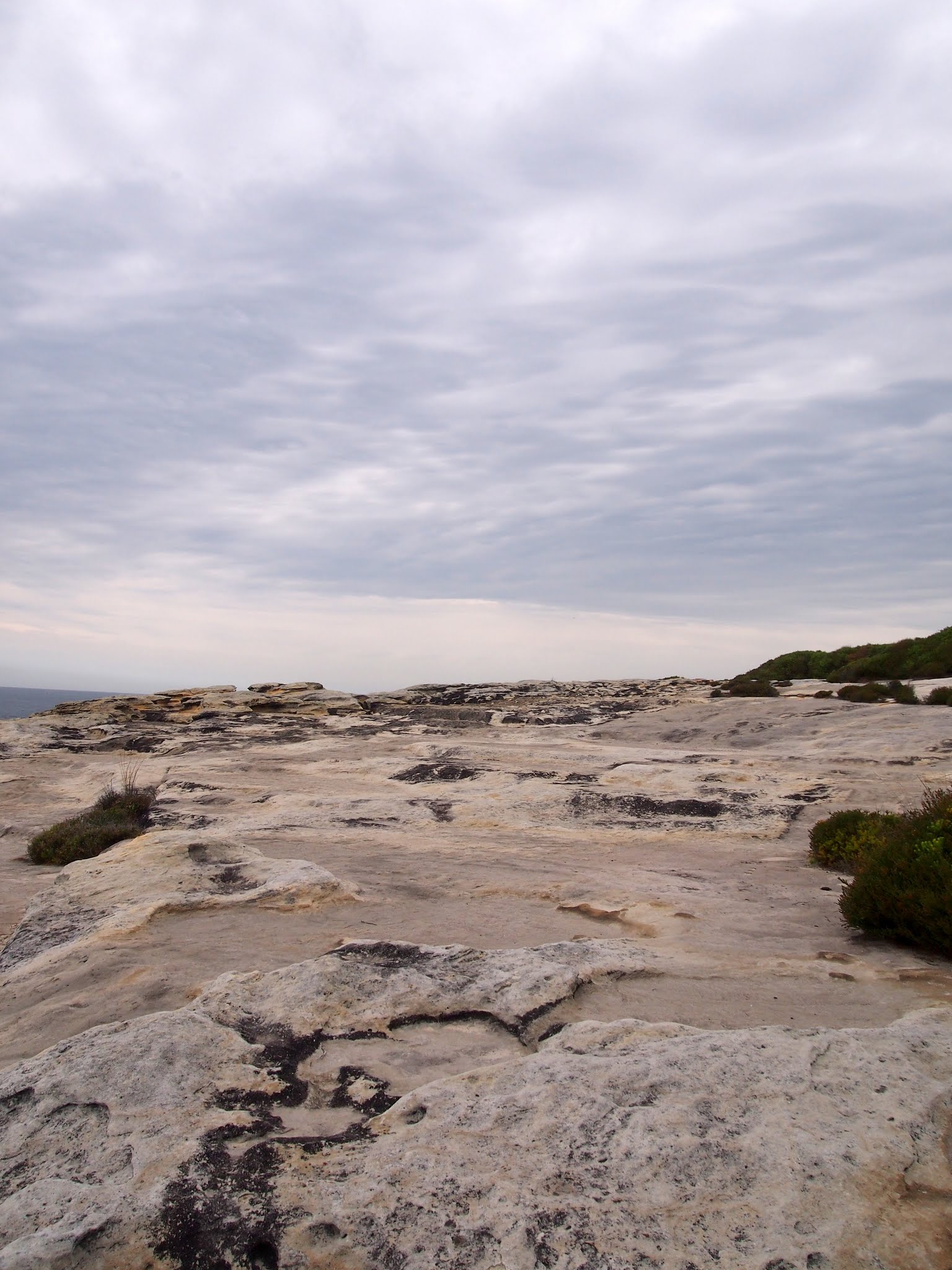
Coast Track (#14)

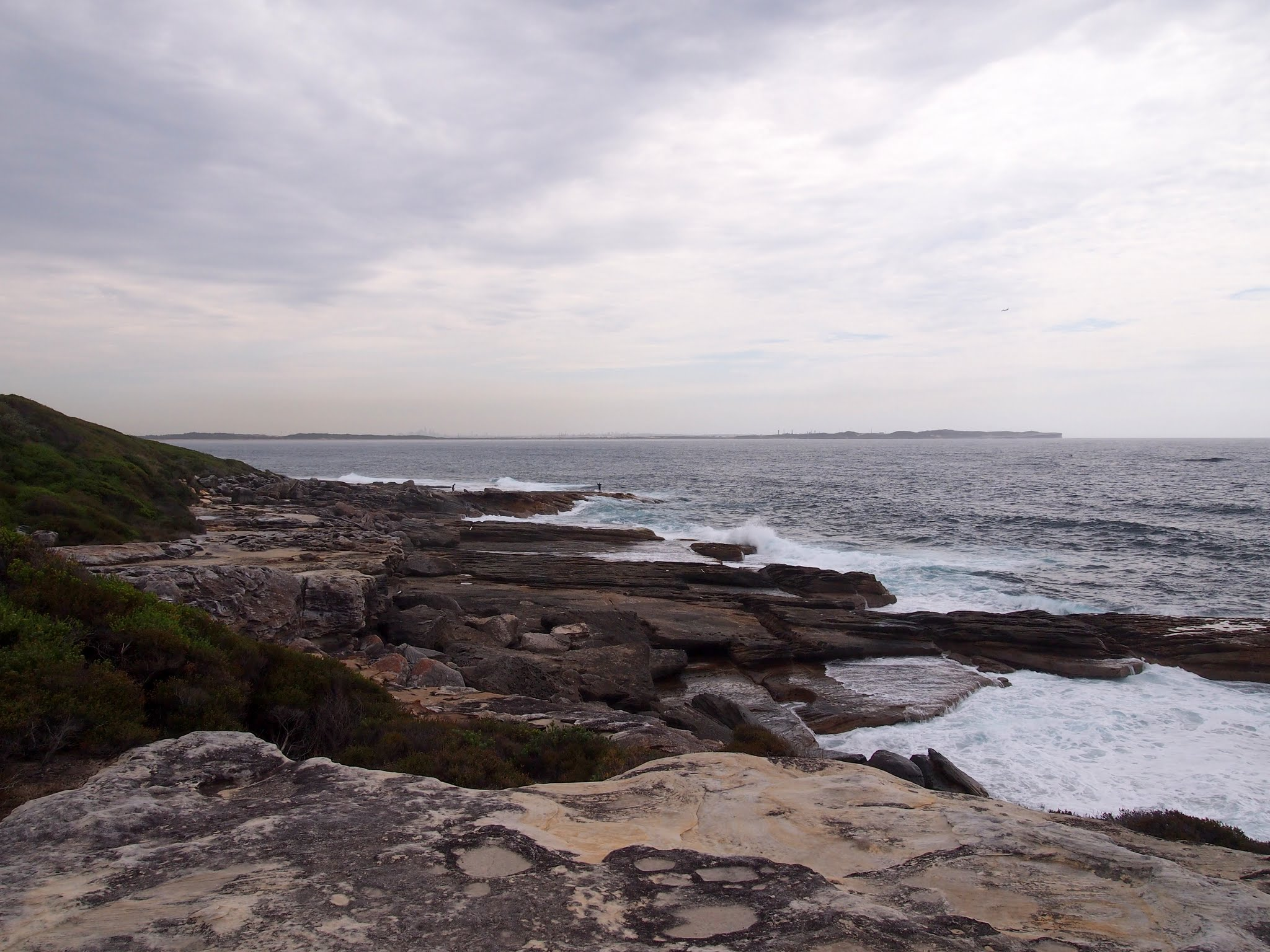
Coast Track (#15)

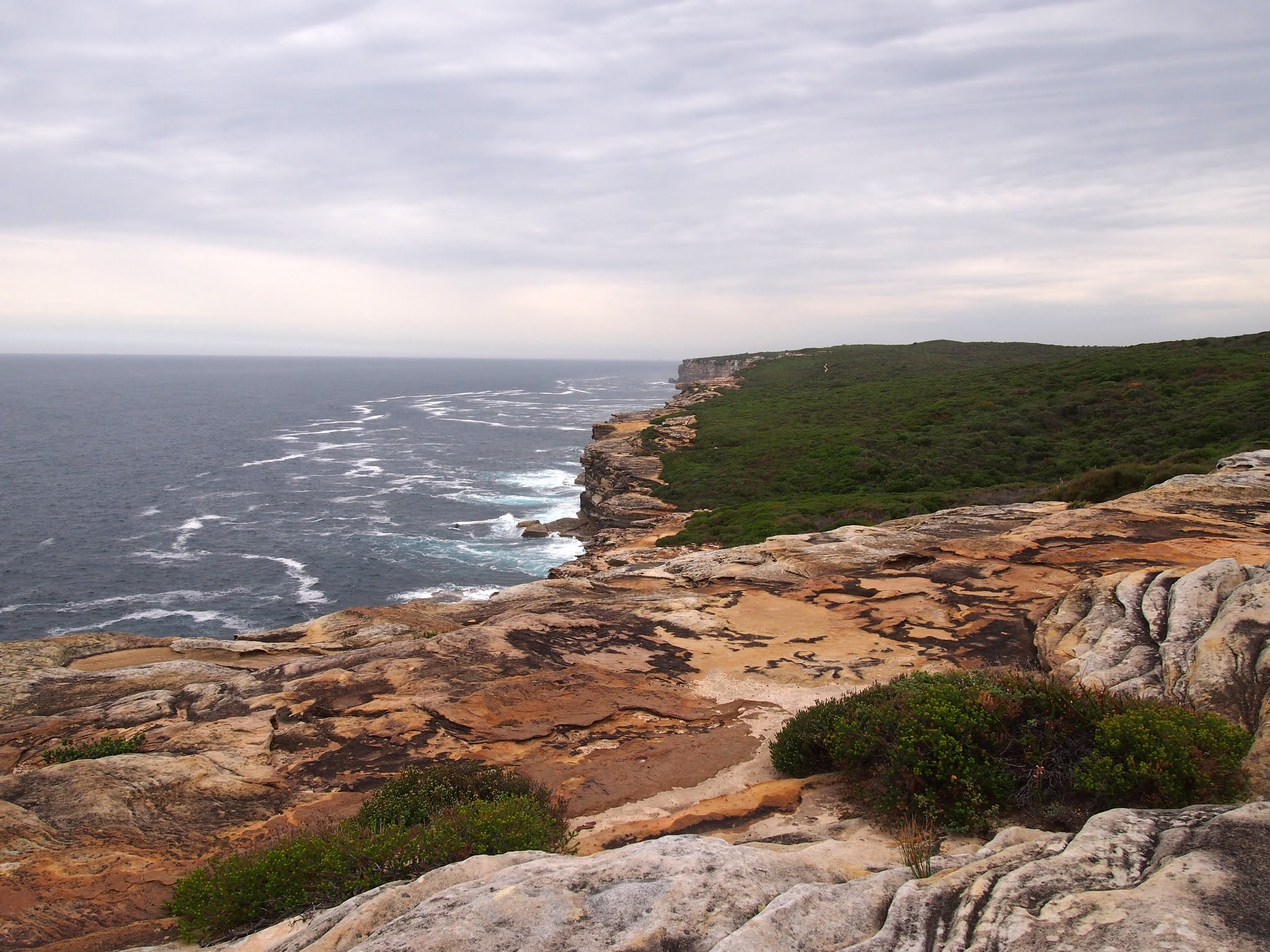
Coast Track (#16)

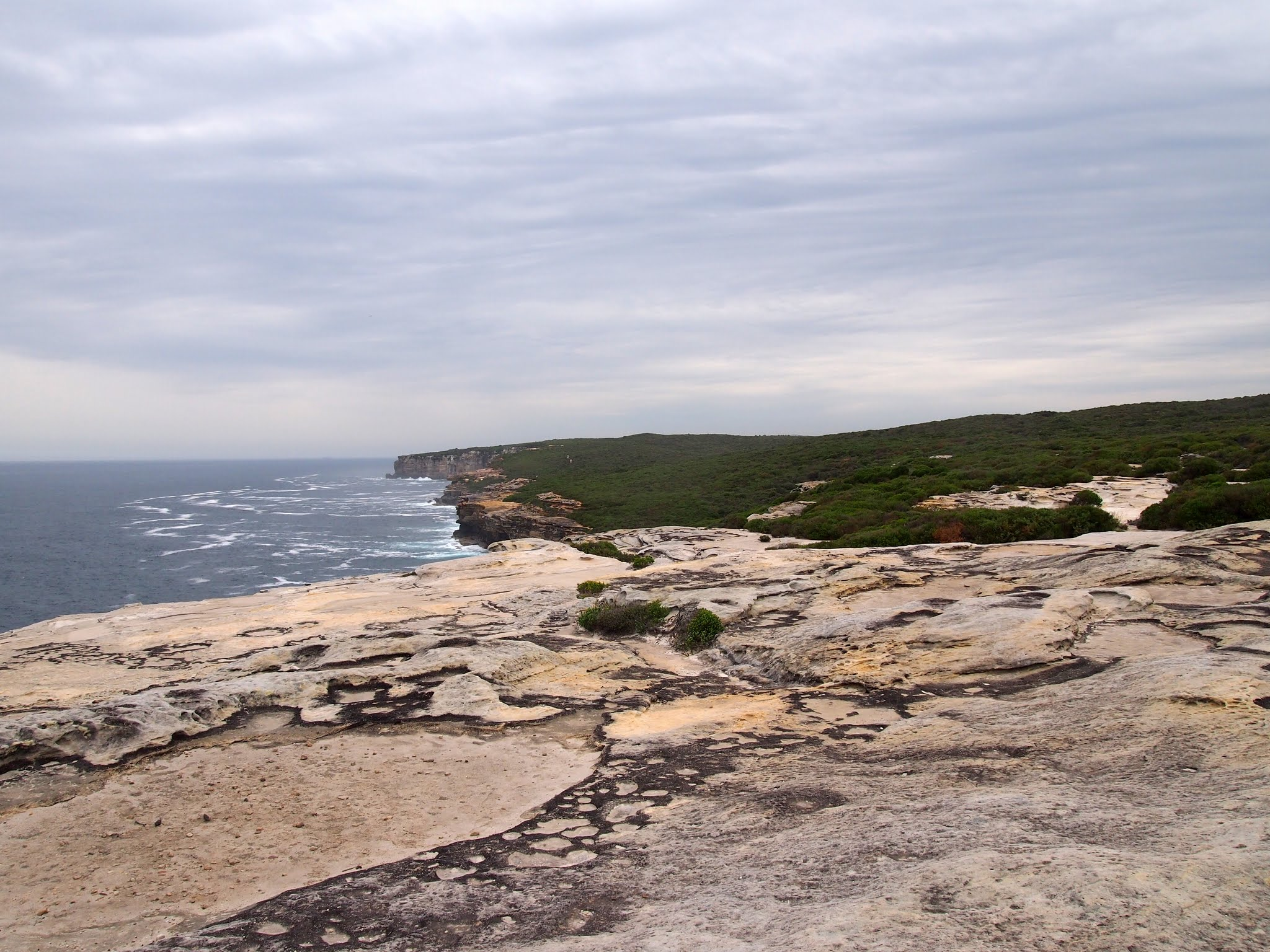
Coast Track (#17)

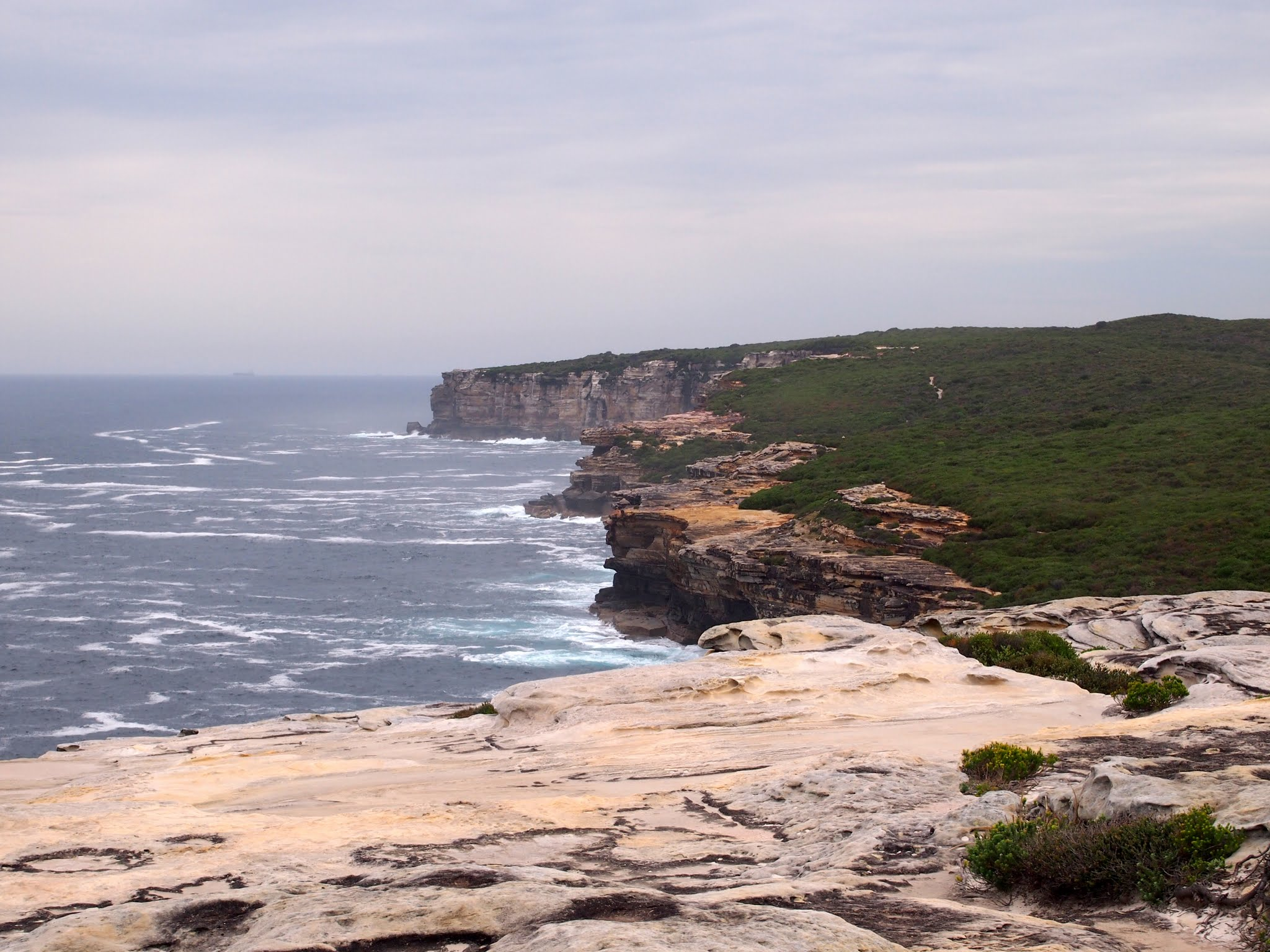
Coast Track (#18)

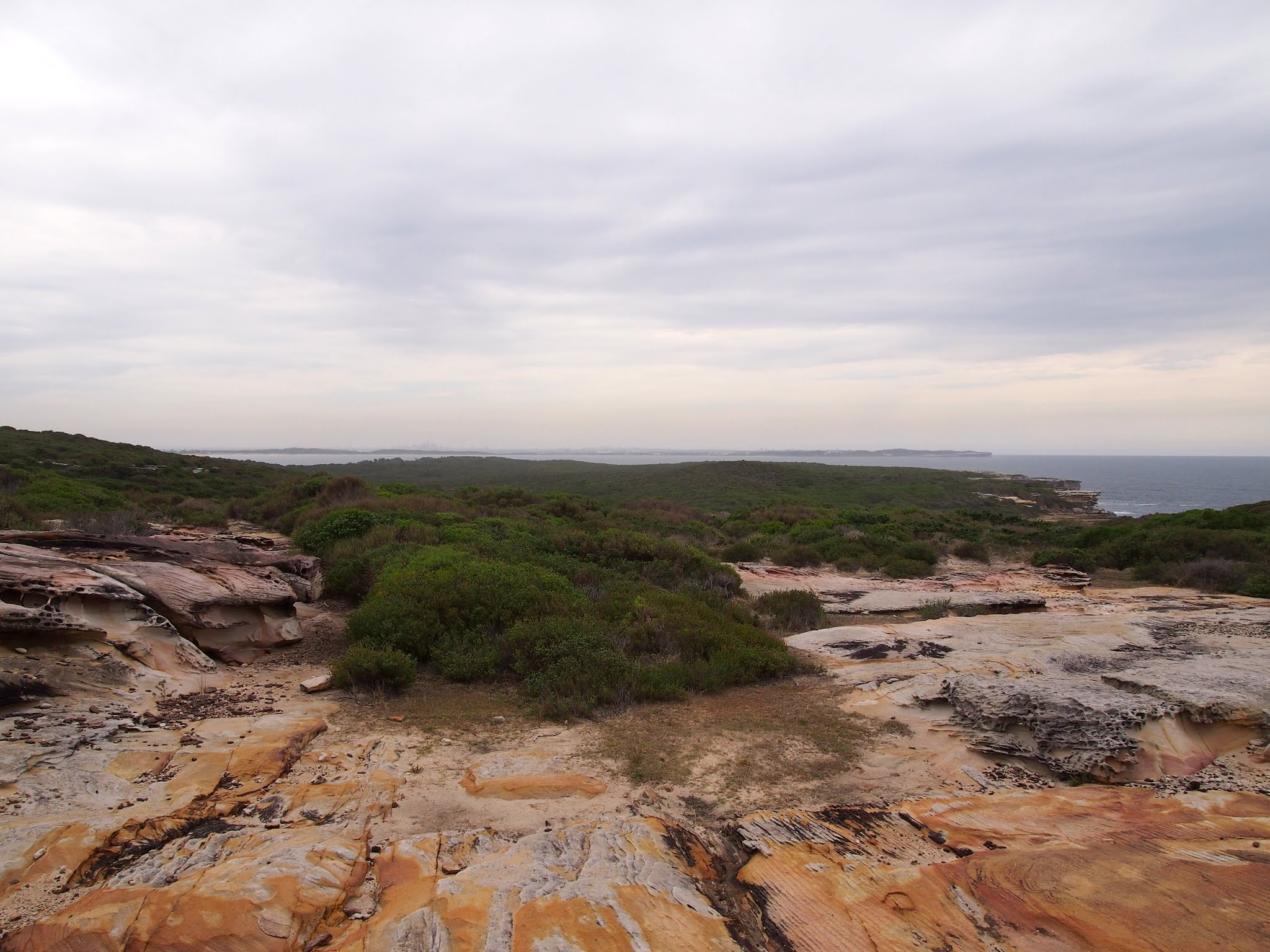
Coast Track (#19)

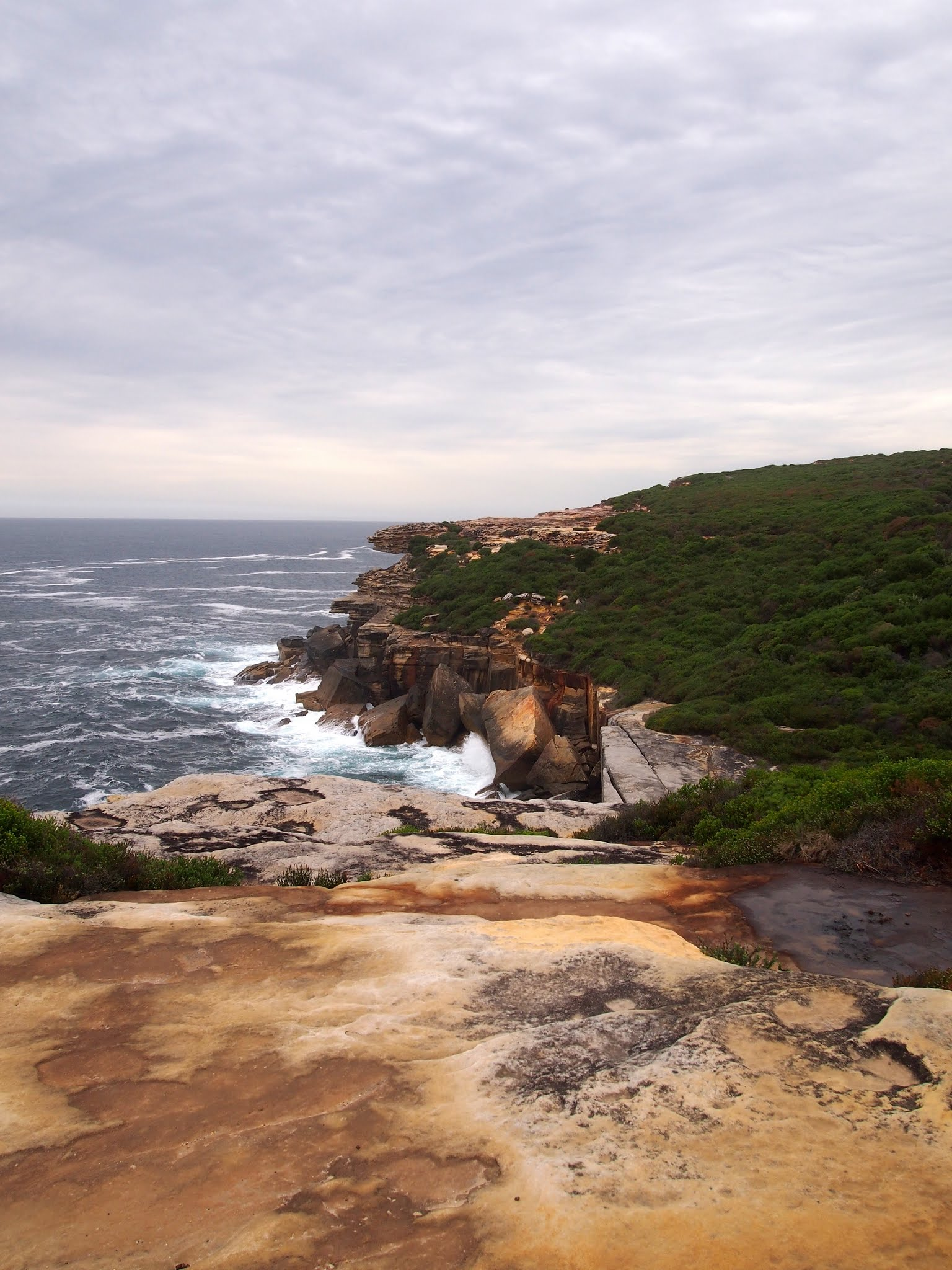
Coast Track (#20)

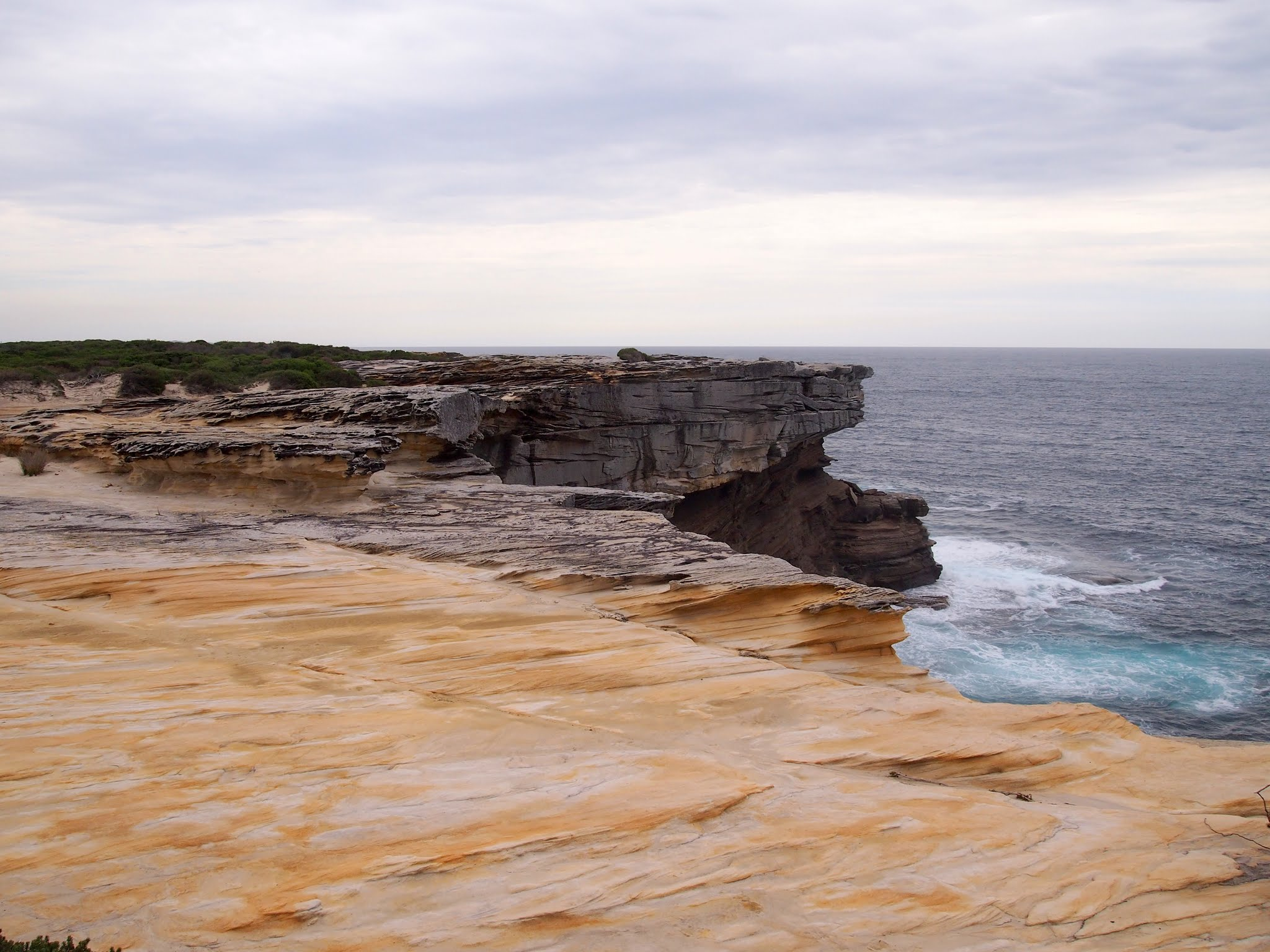
Coast Track (#21)

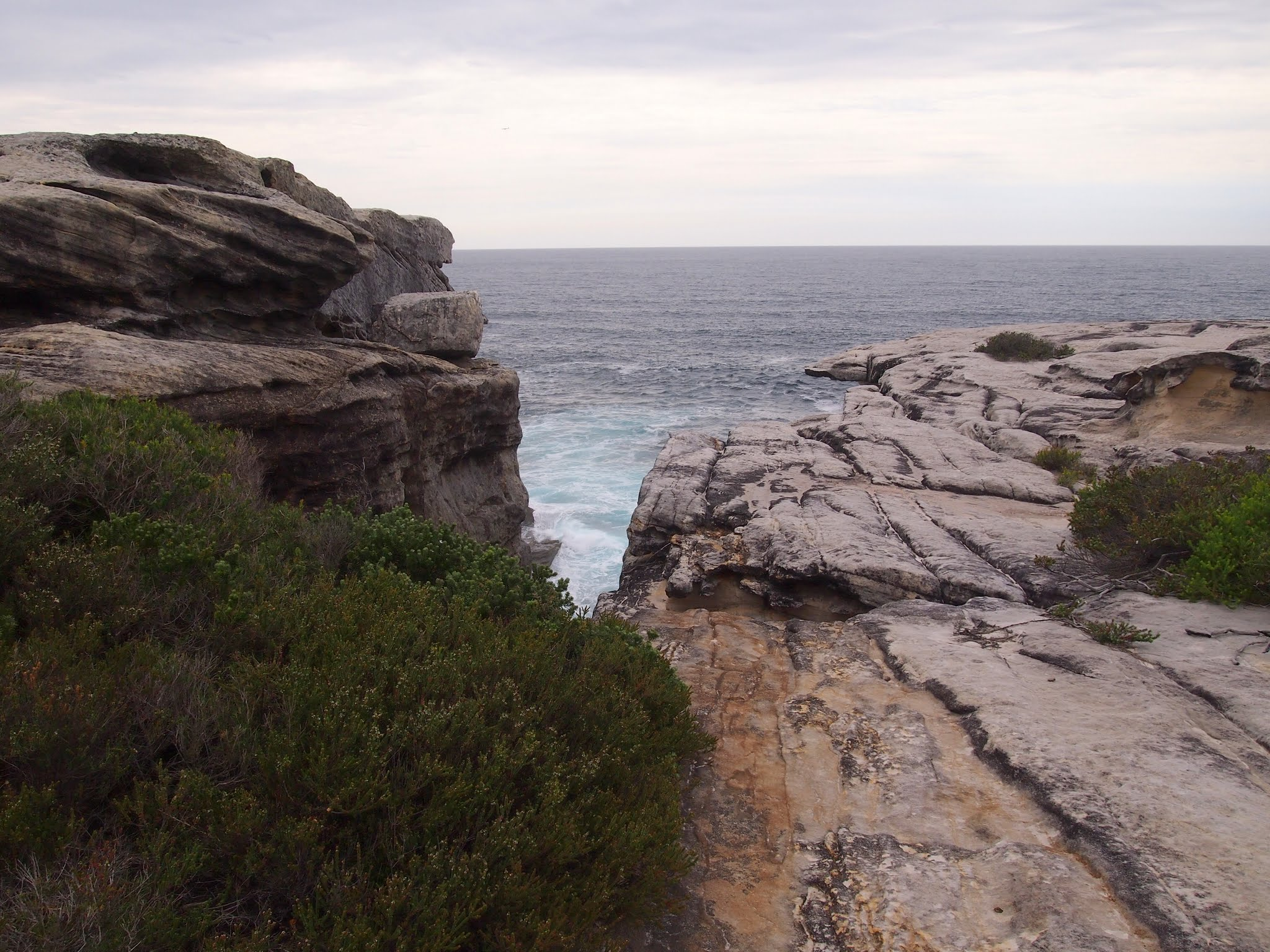
Coast Track (#22)

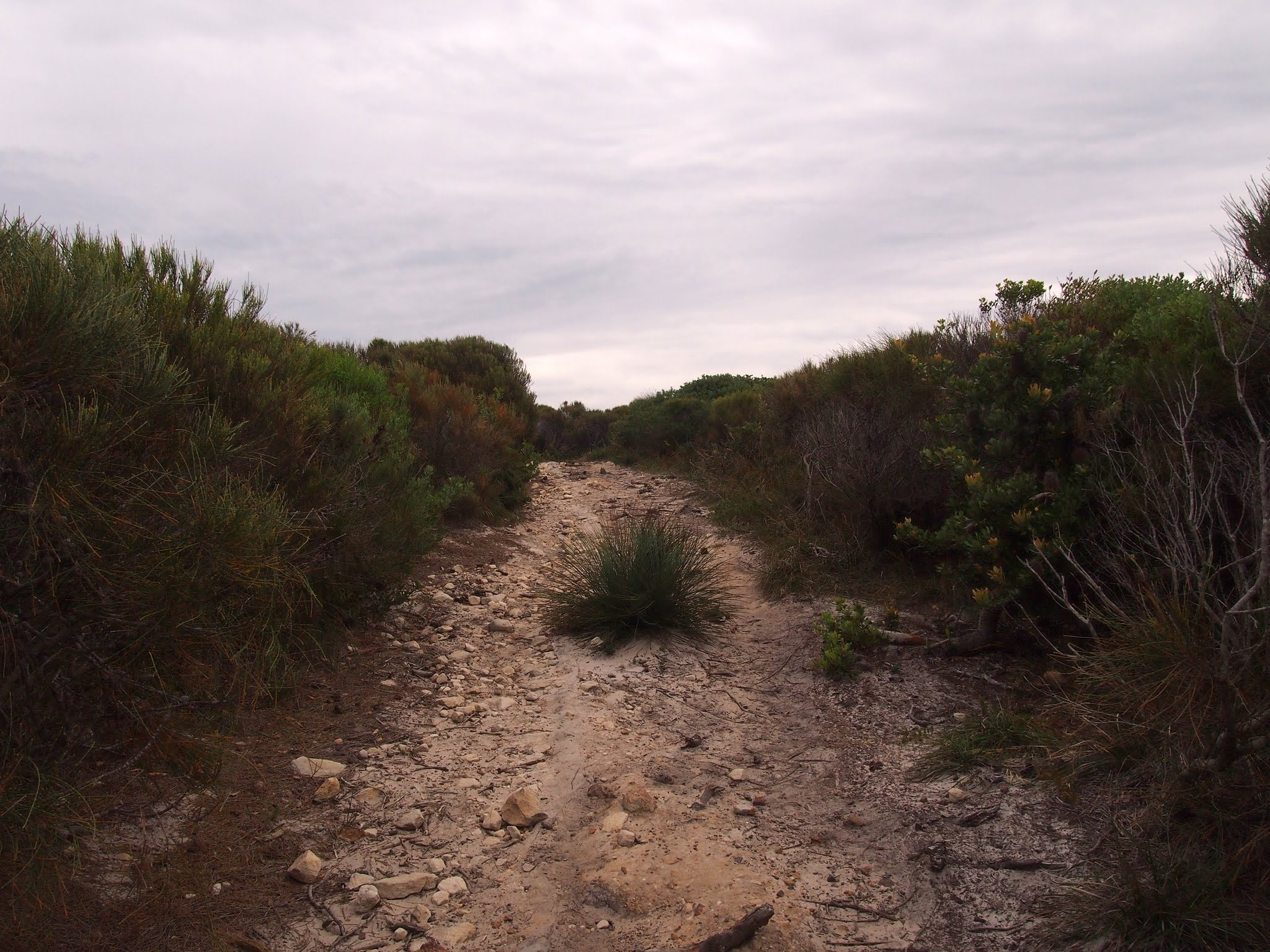
Coast Track (#23)

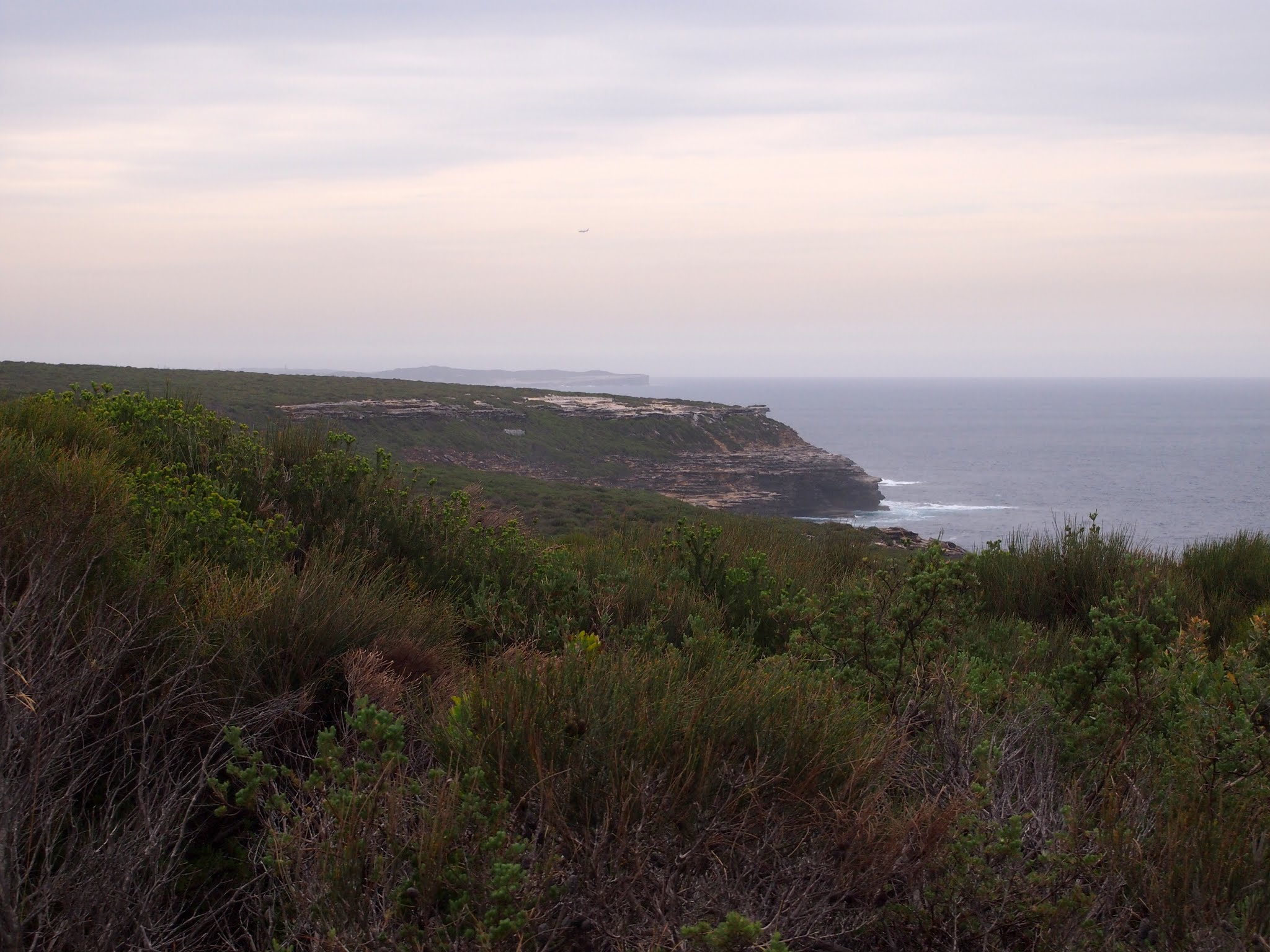
Coast Track (#24)

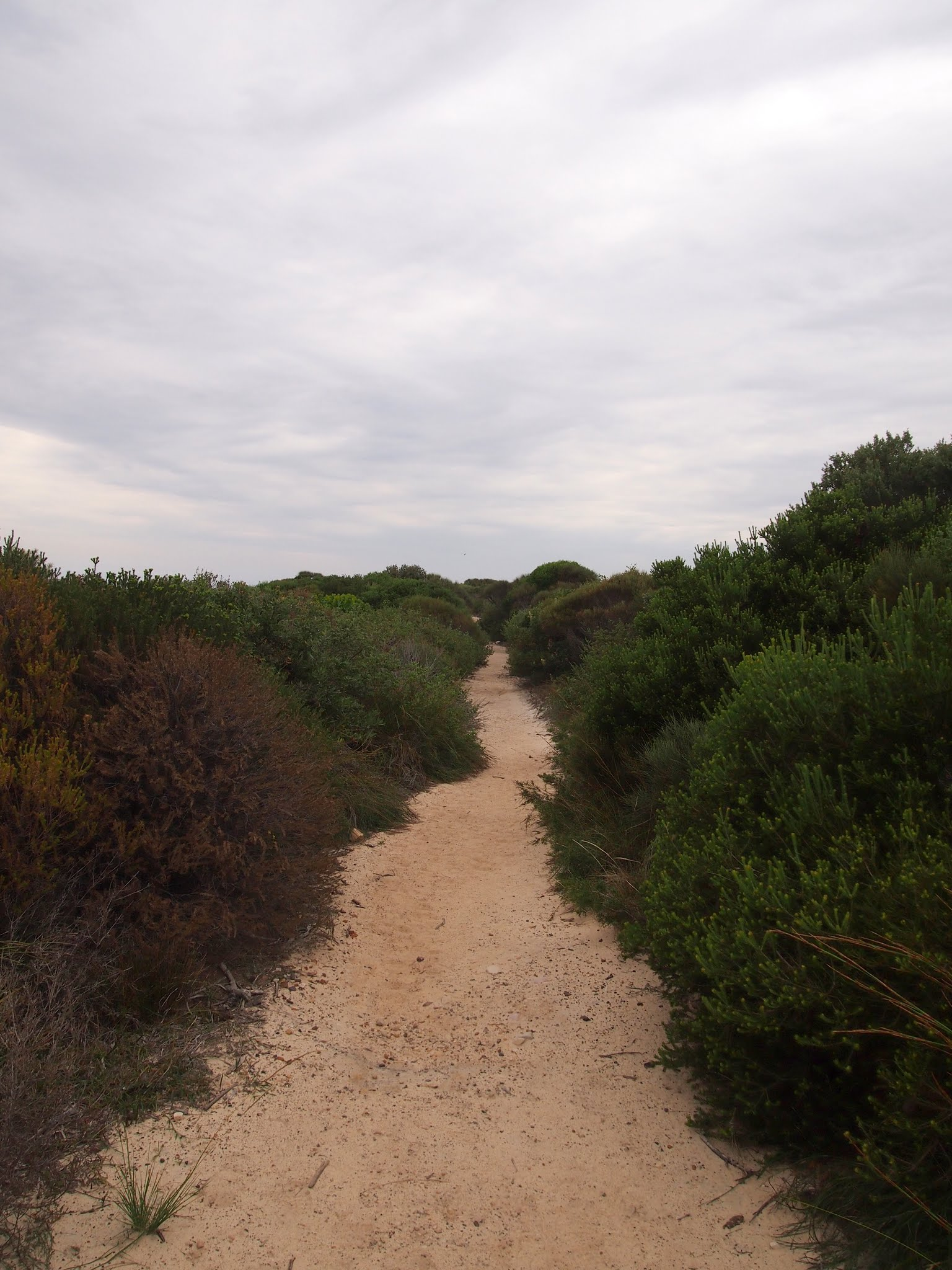
Coast Track (#25)

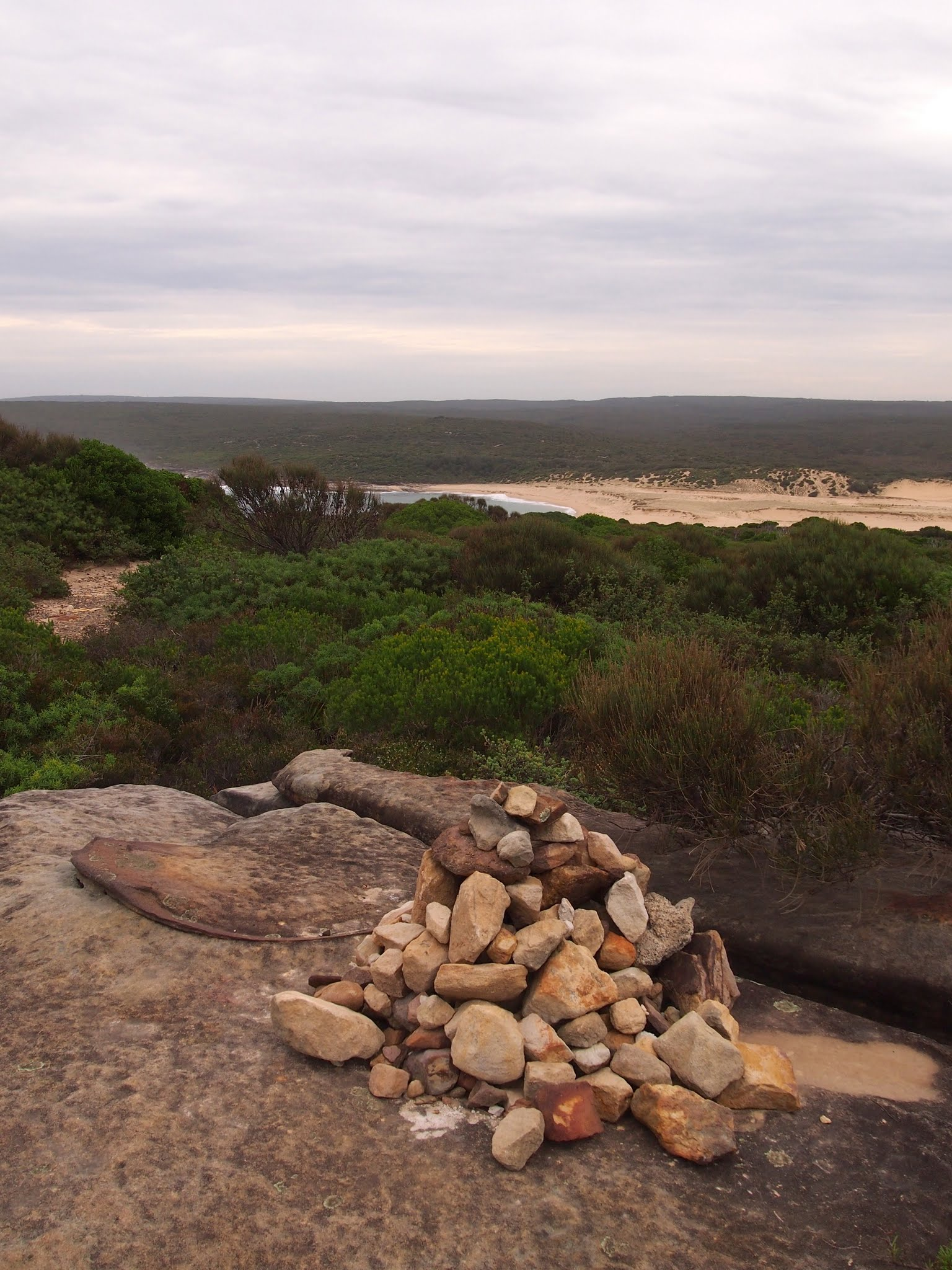
Coast Track (#26)

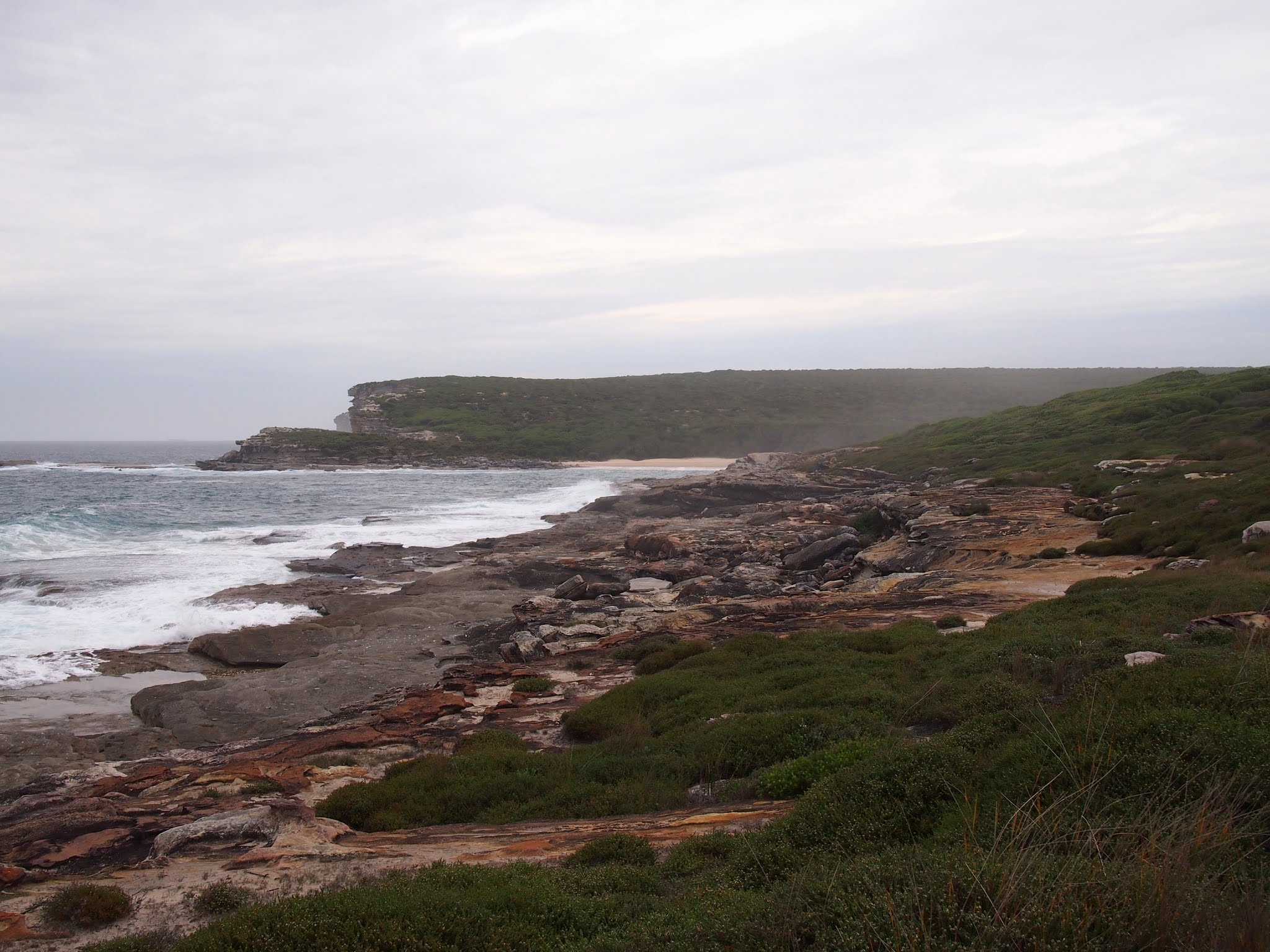
Coast Track (#27)

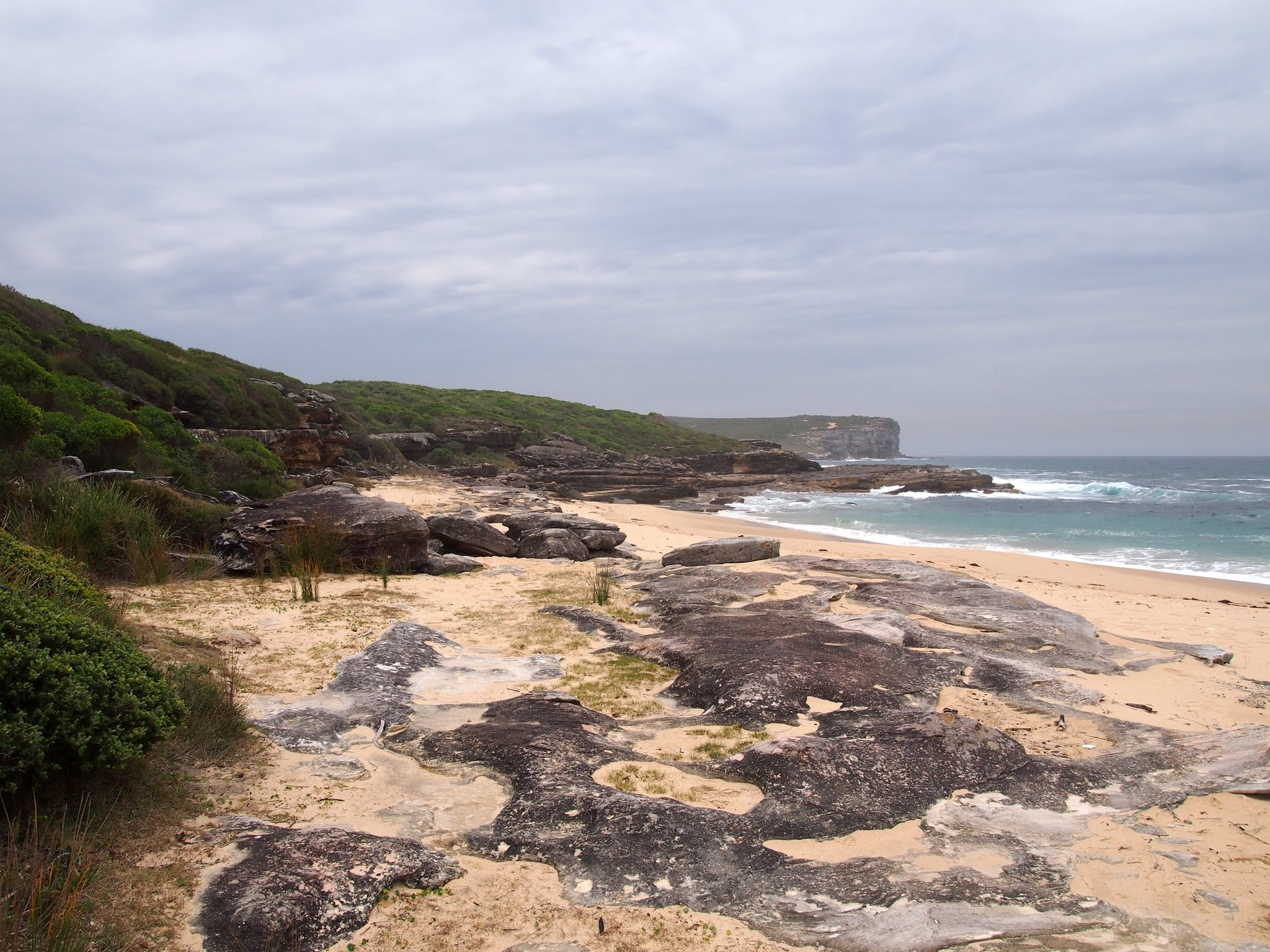
Coast Track (#28)

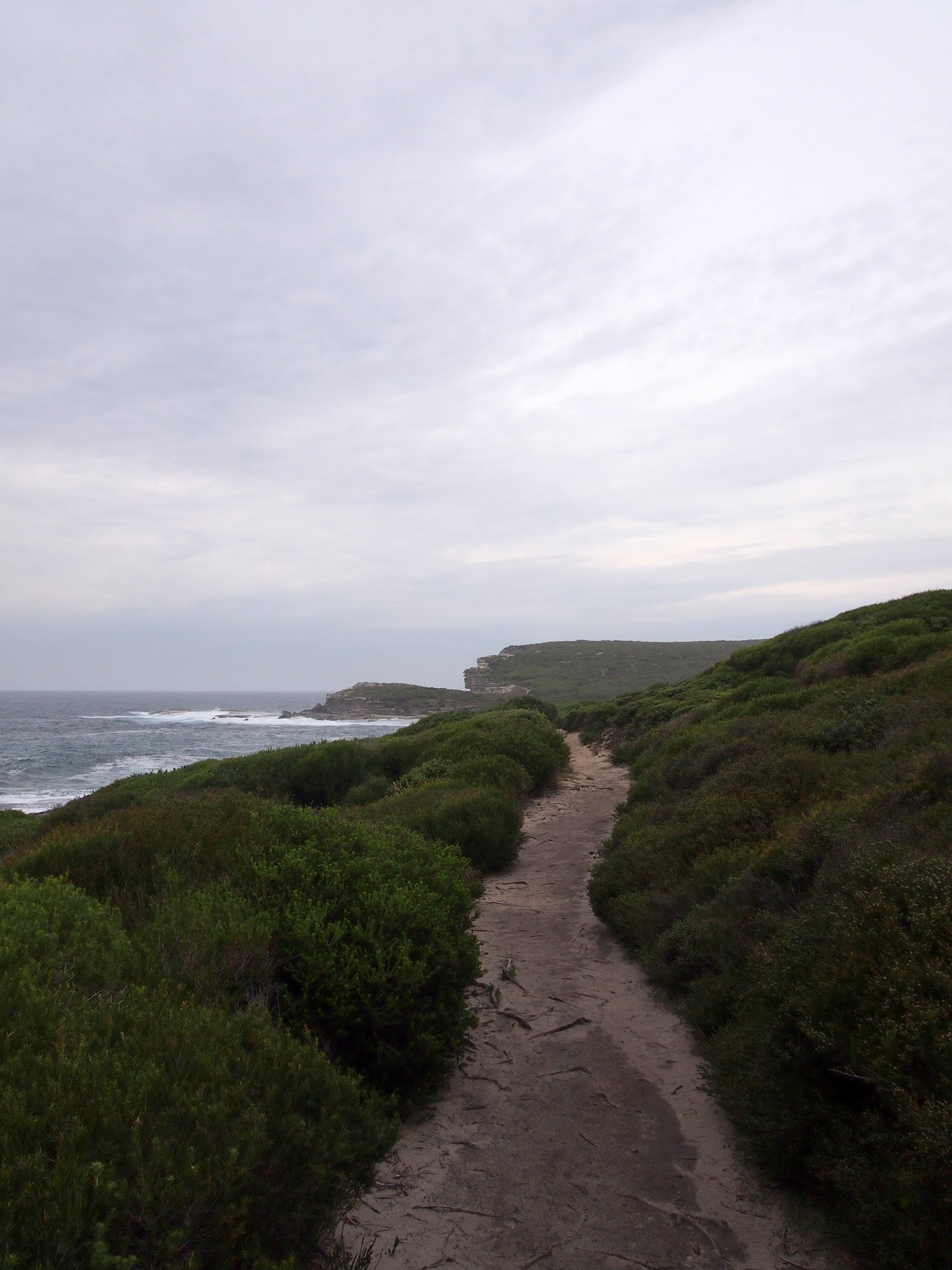
Coast Track (#29)

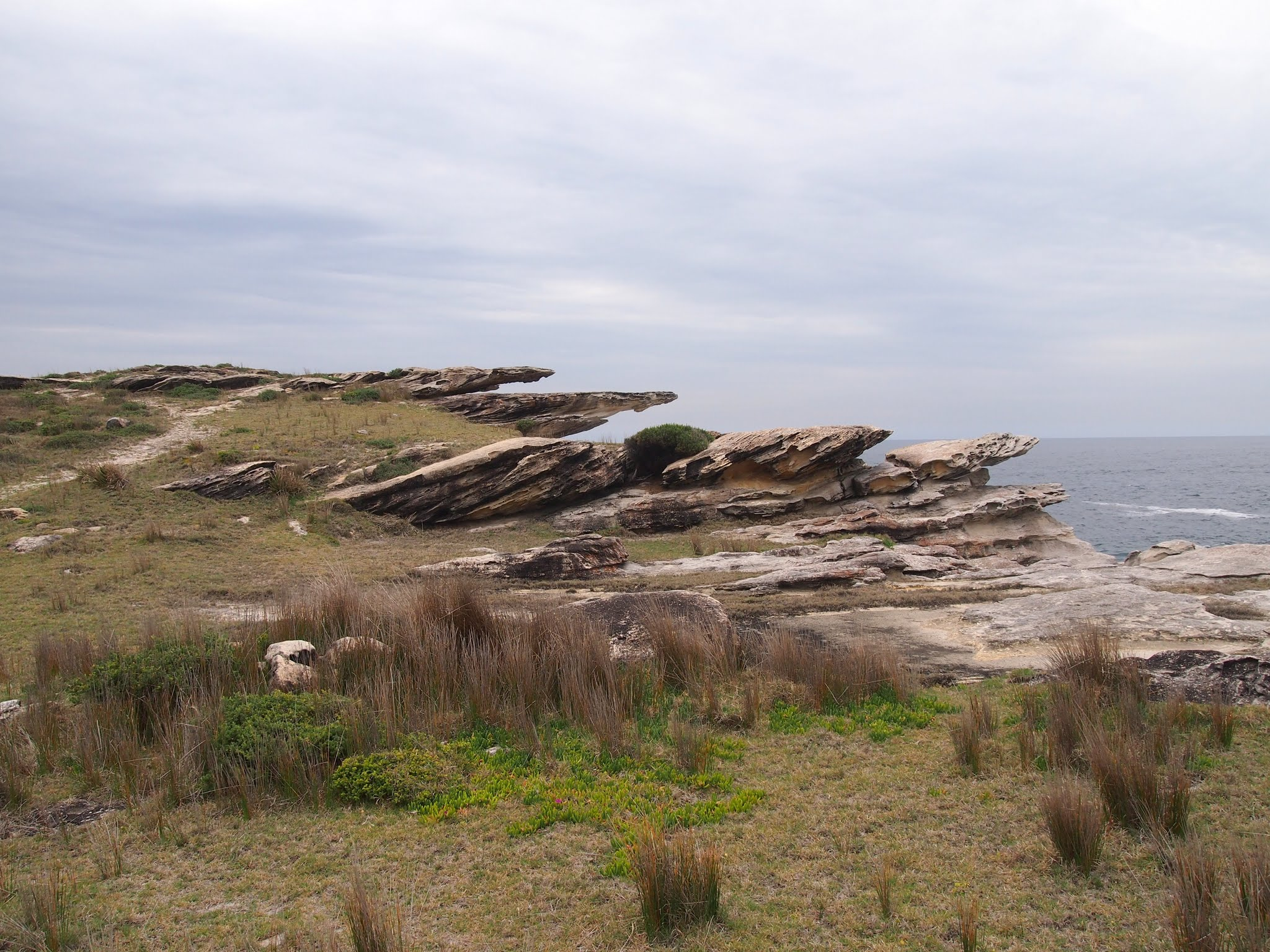
Coast Track (#30)

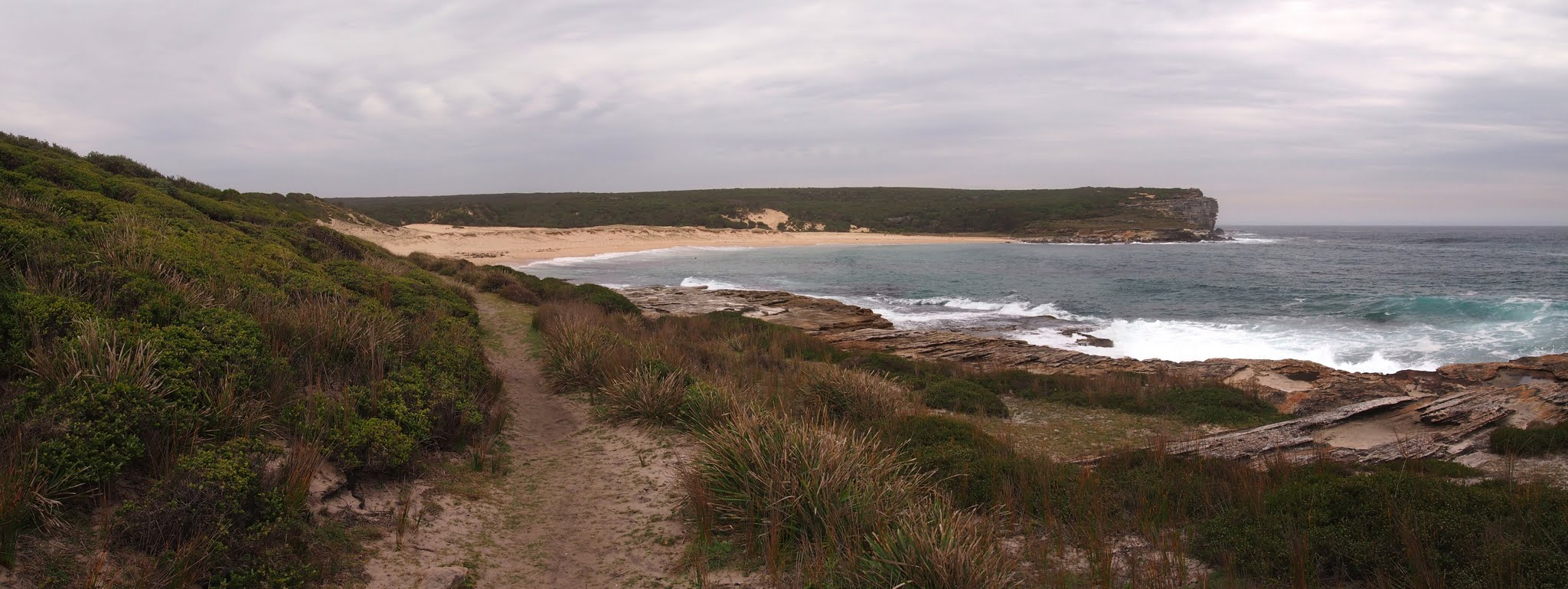
Coast Track (#31)

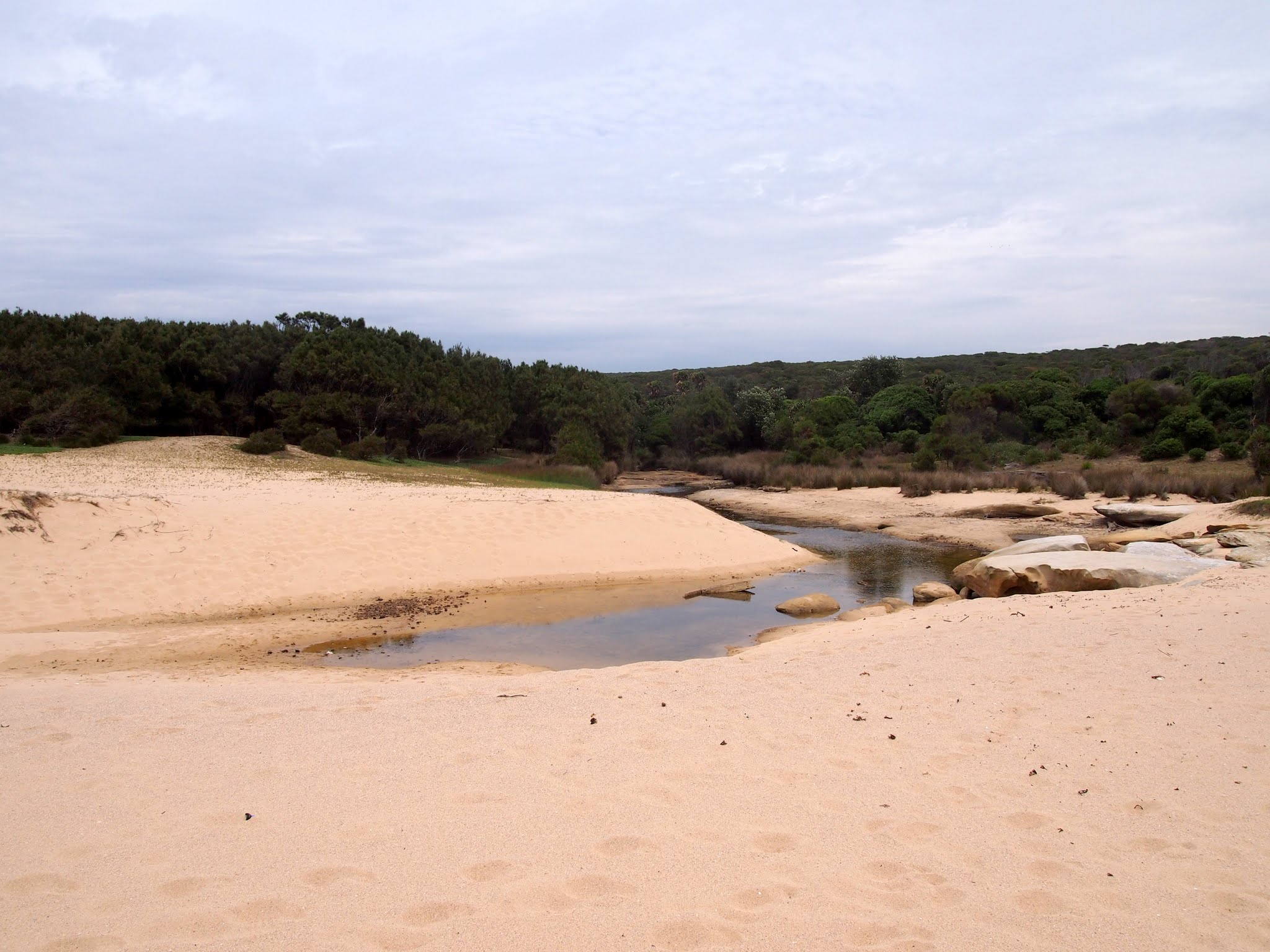
Coast Track (#32)

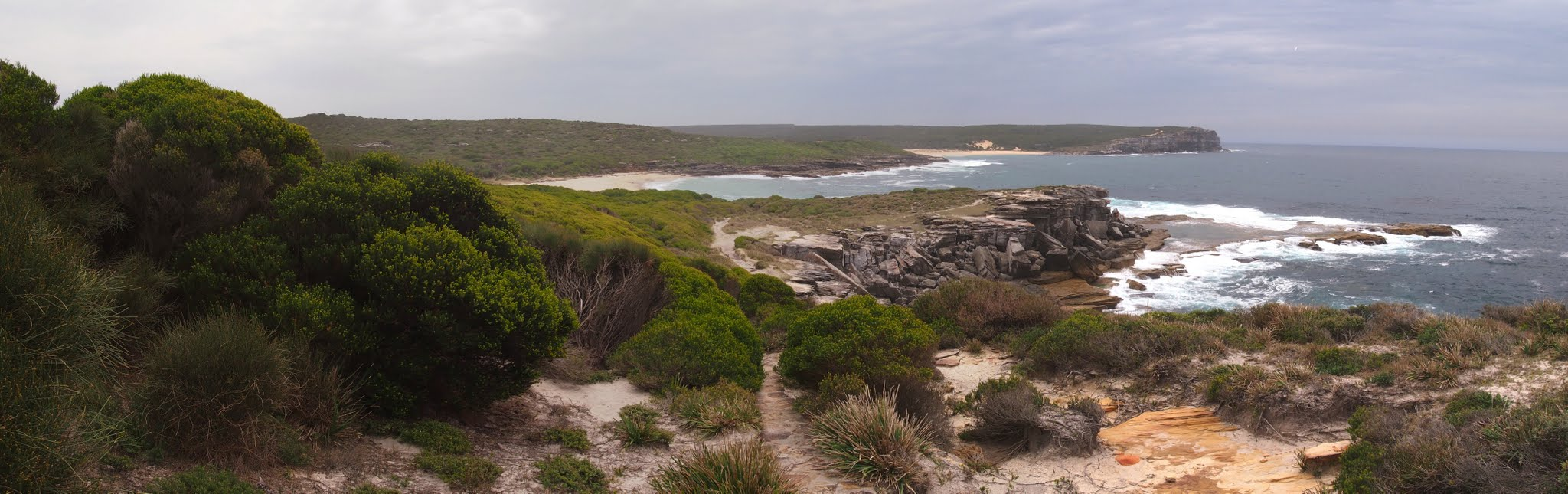
Coast Track (#33)

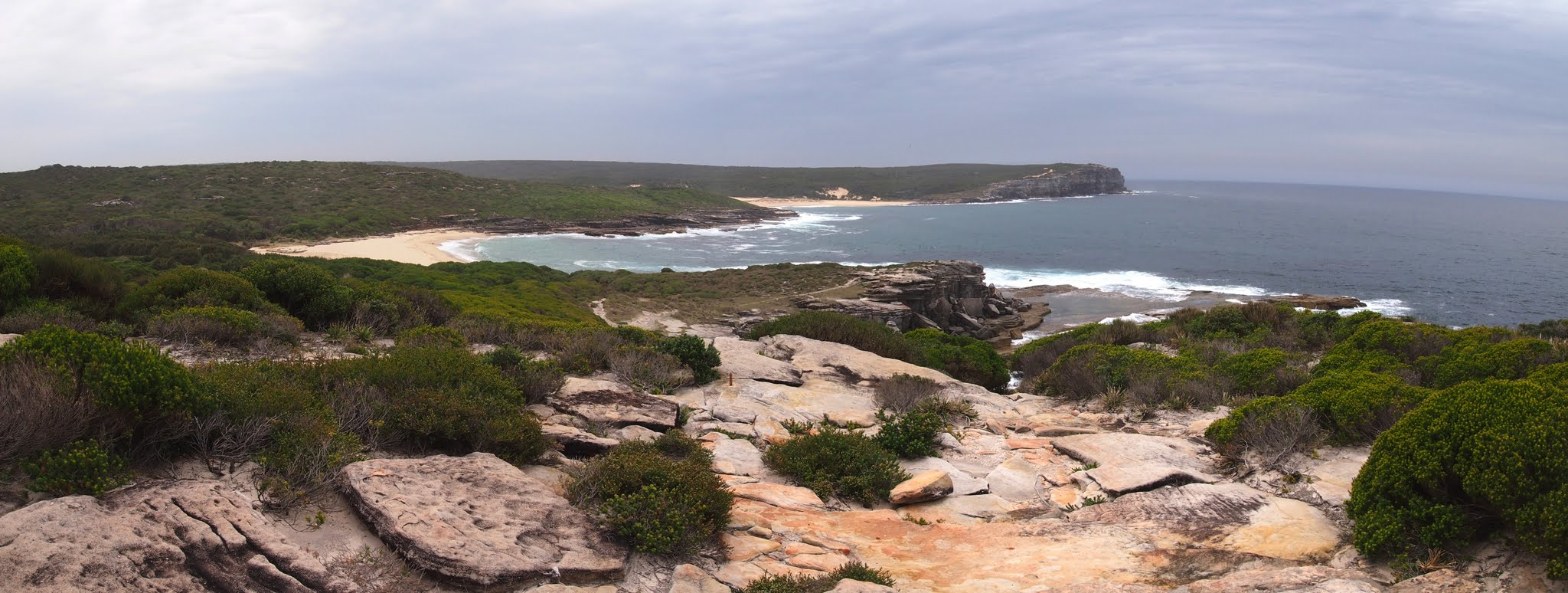
Coast Track (#34)

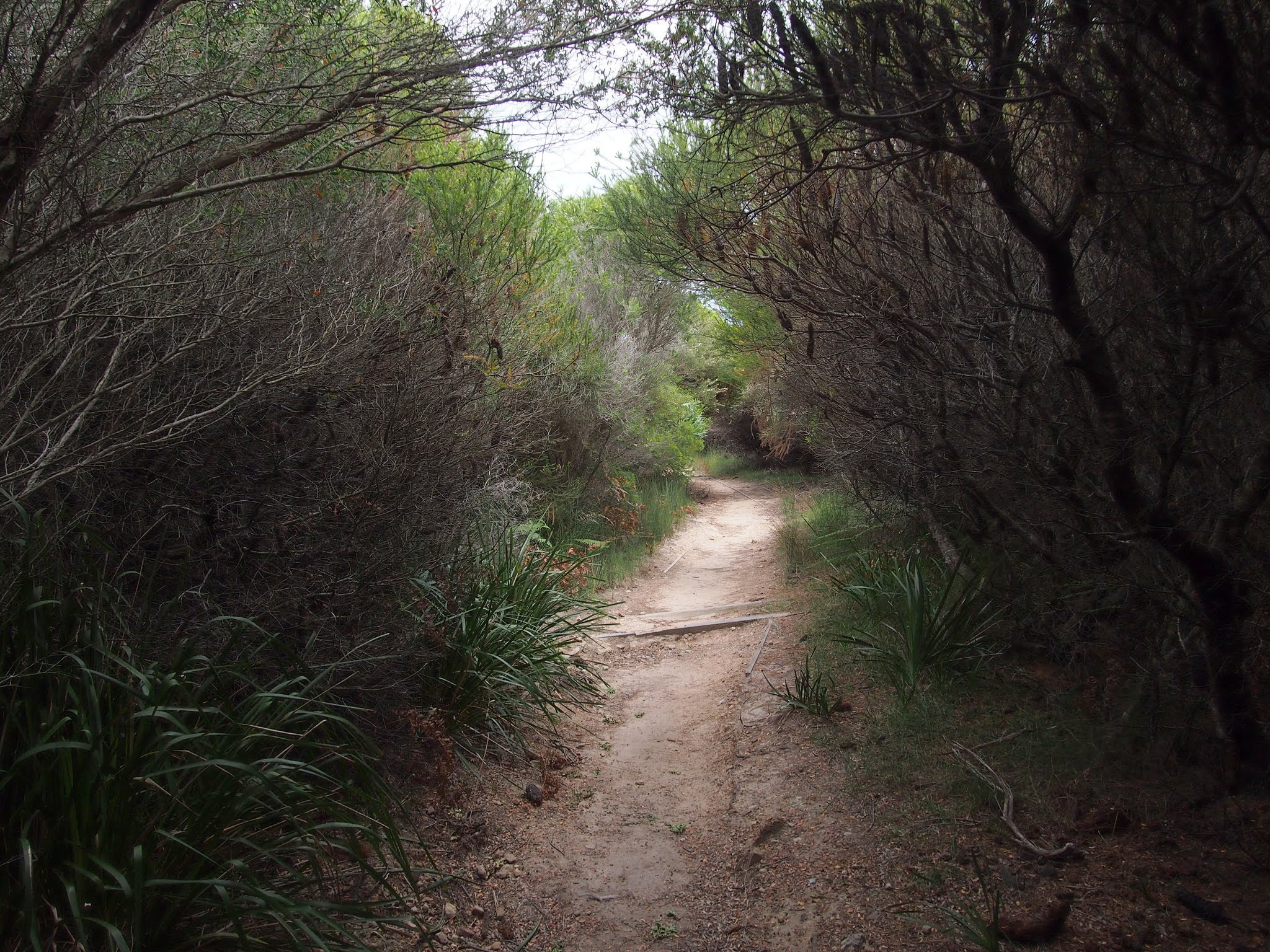
Coast Track (#35)

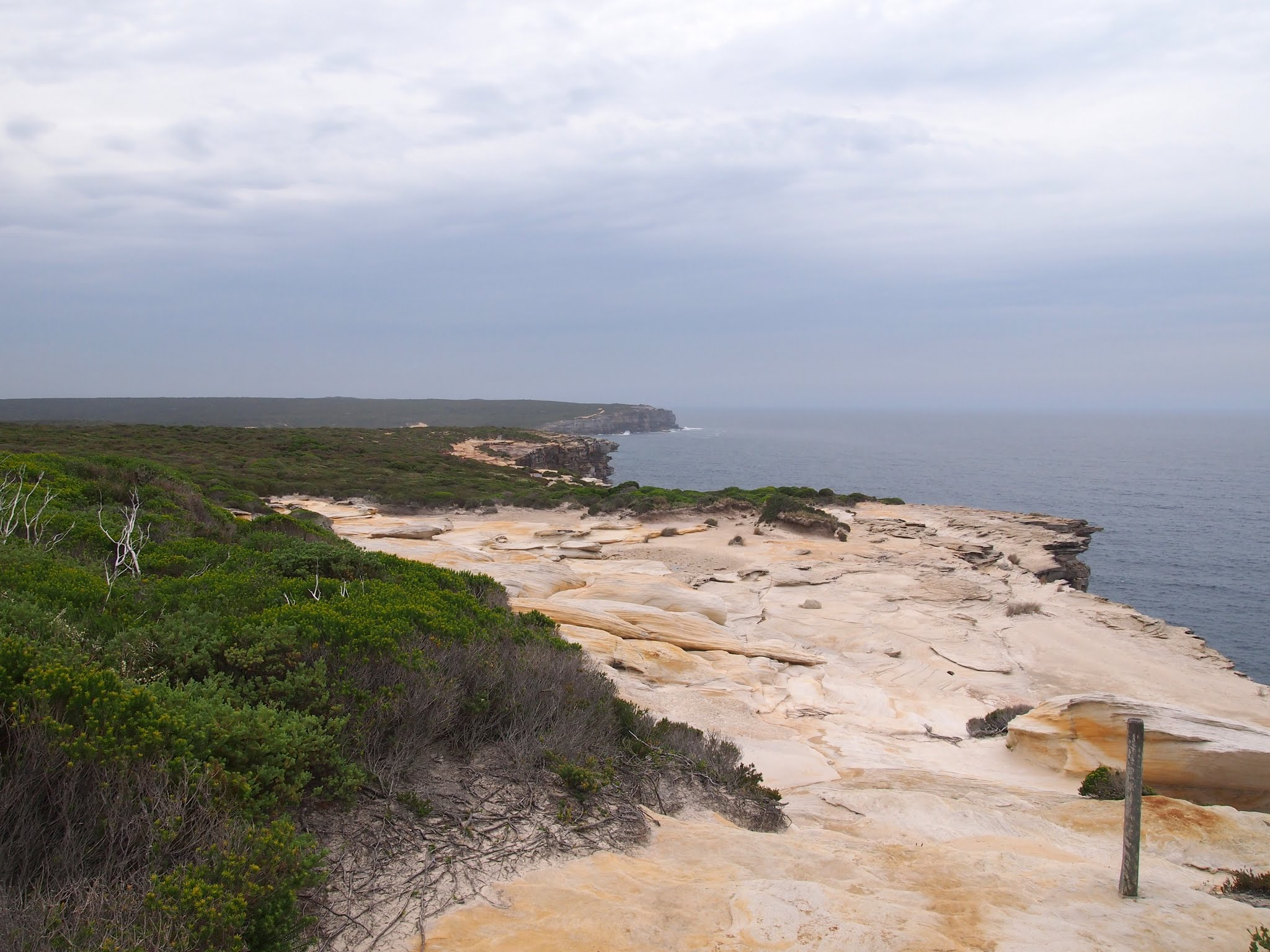
Coast Track (#36)

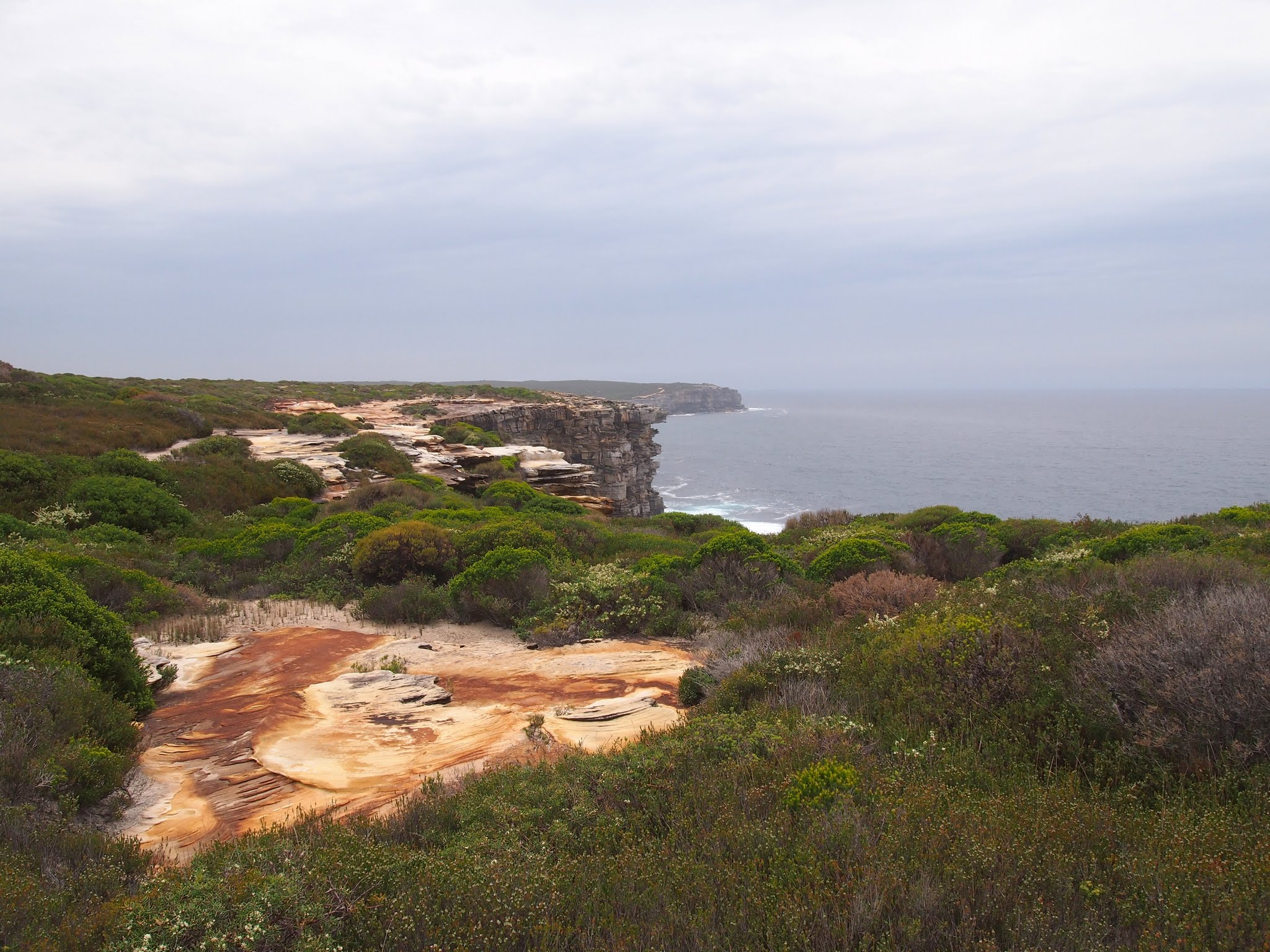
Coast Track (#37)

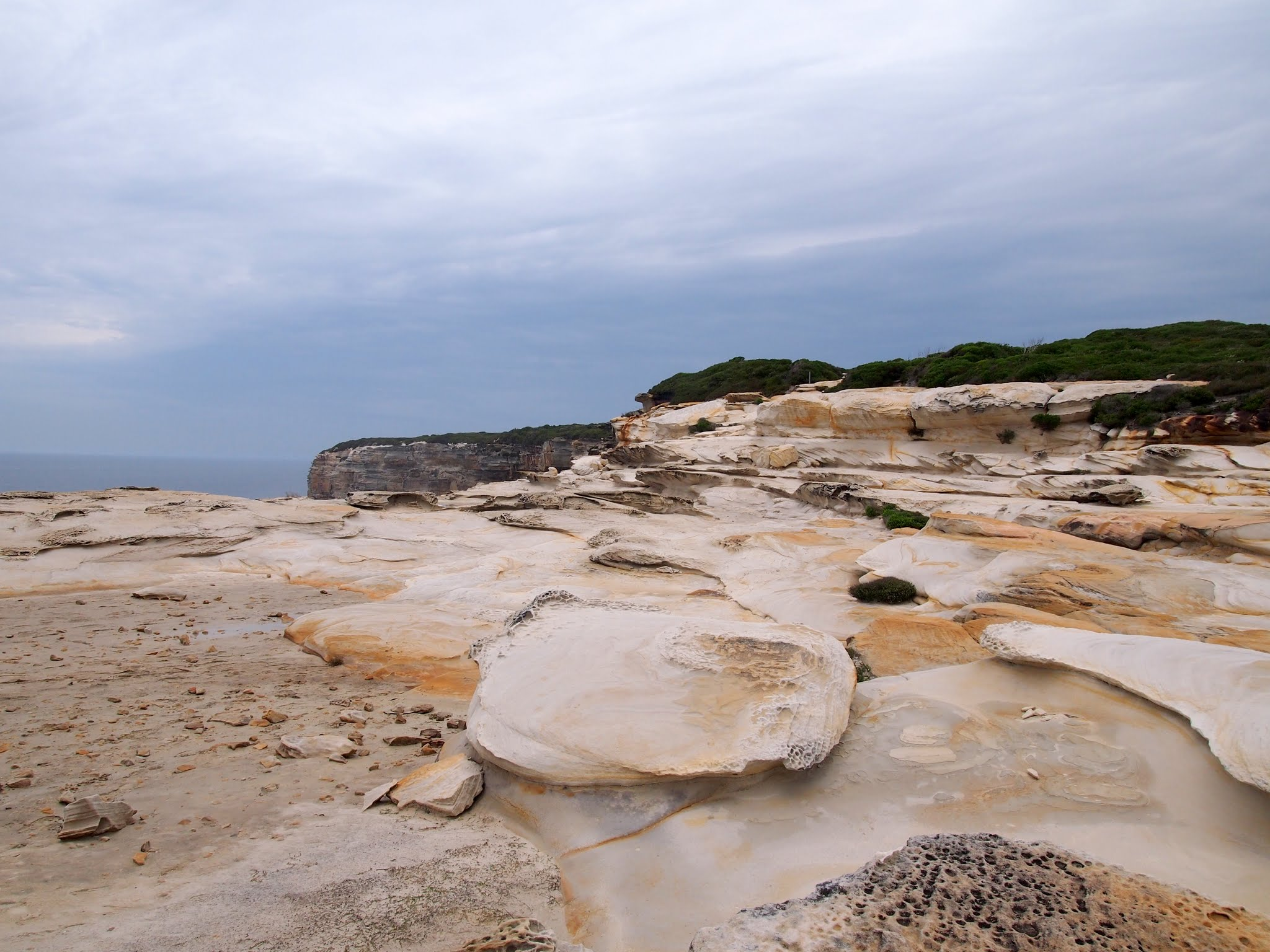
Coast Track (#38)

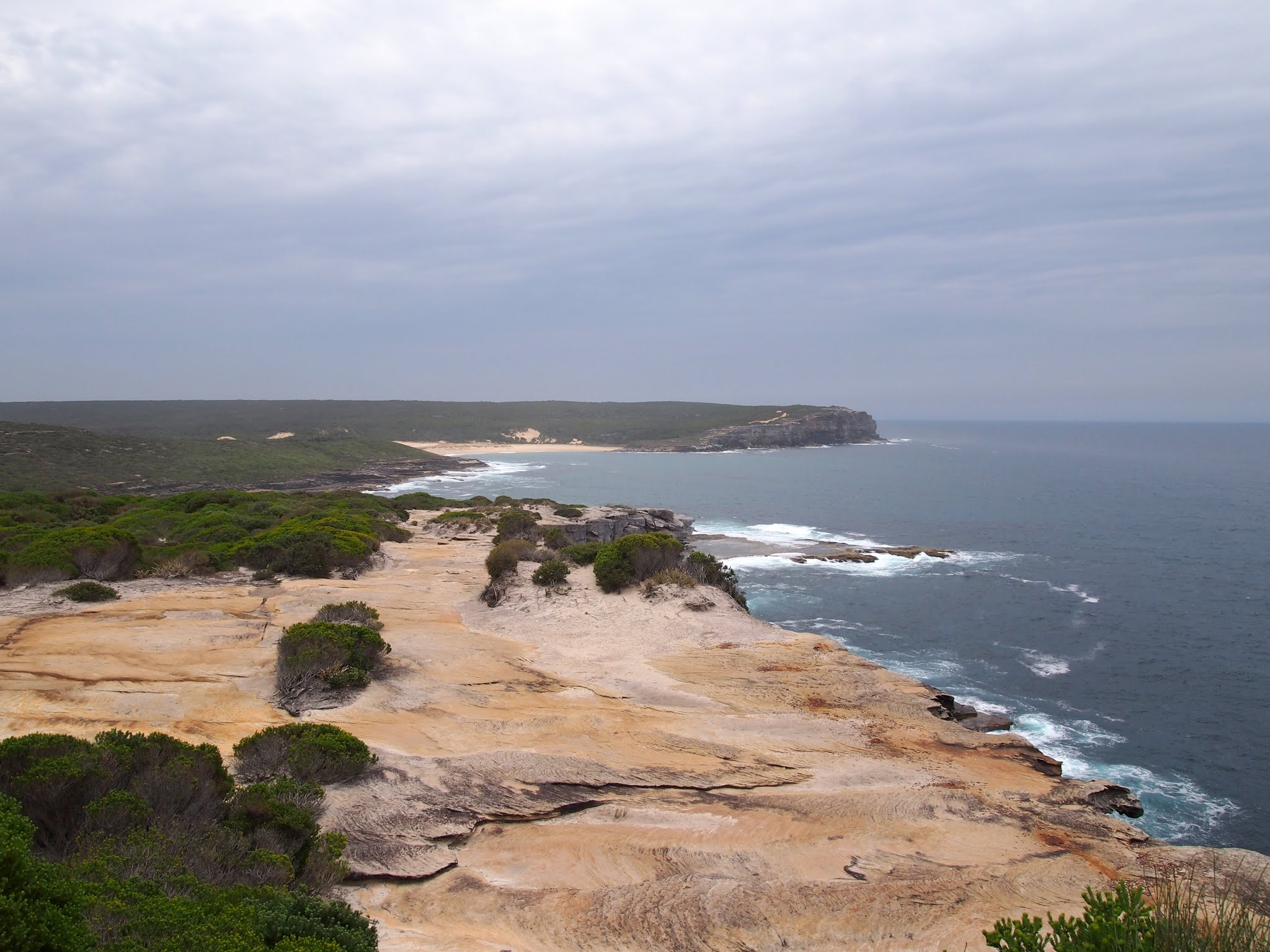
Coast Track (#39)

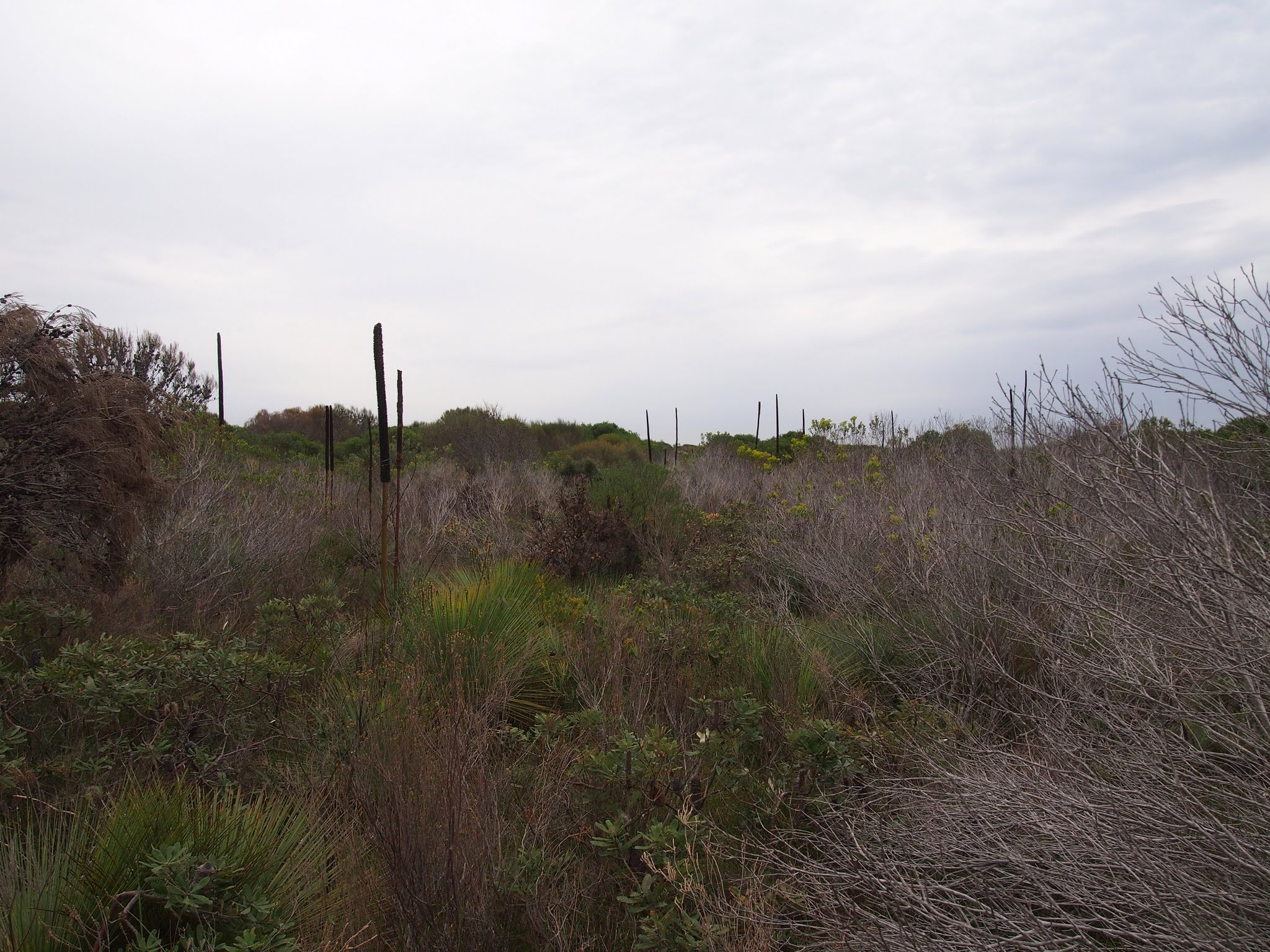
Coast Track (#40)

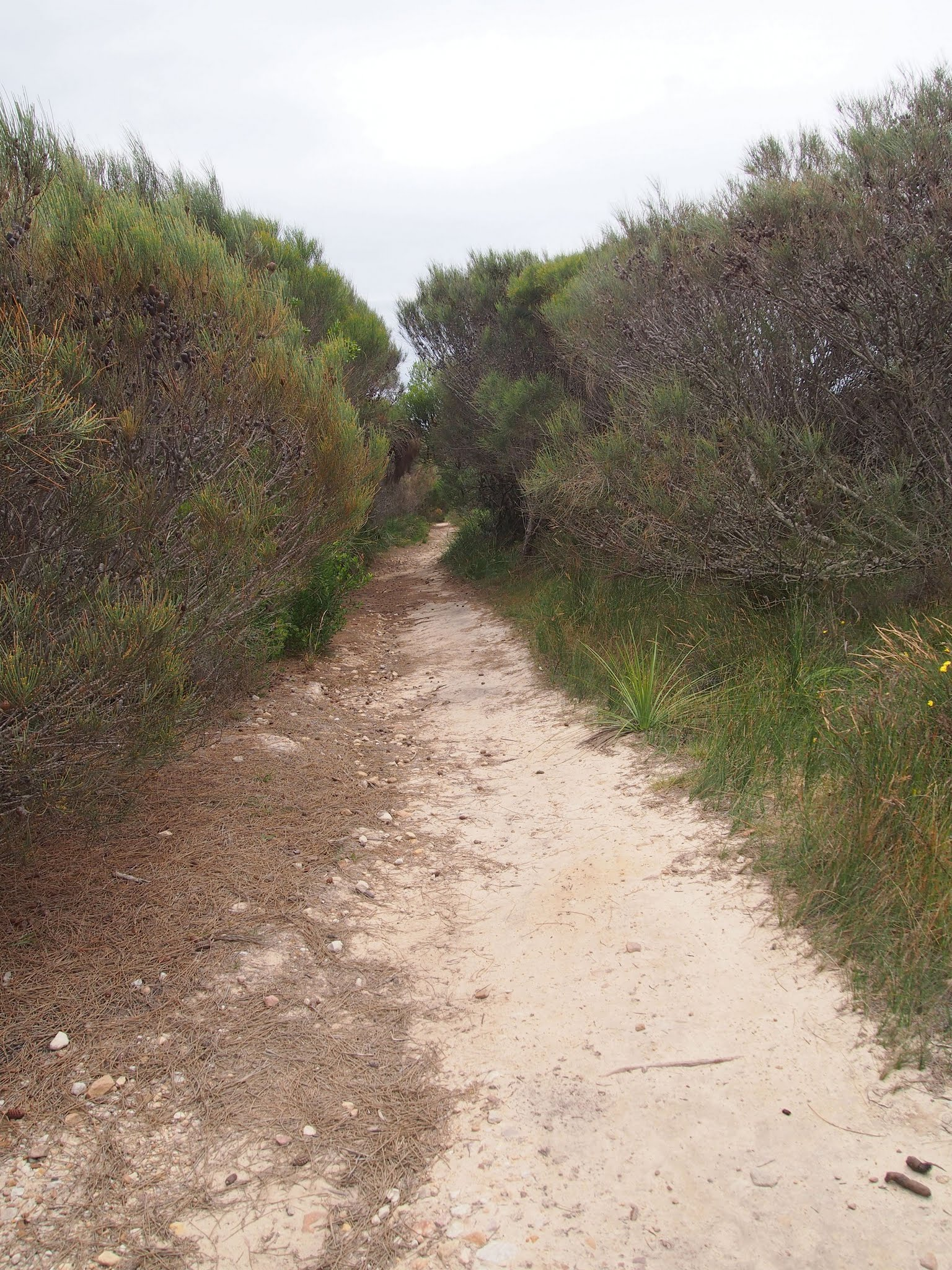
Coast Track (#41)

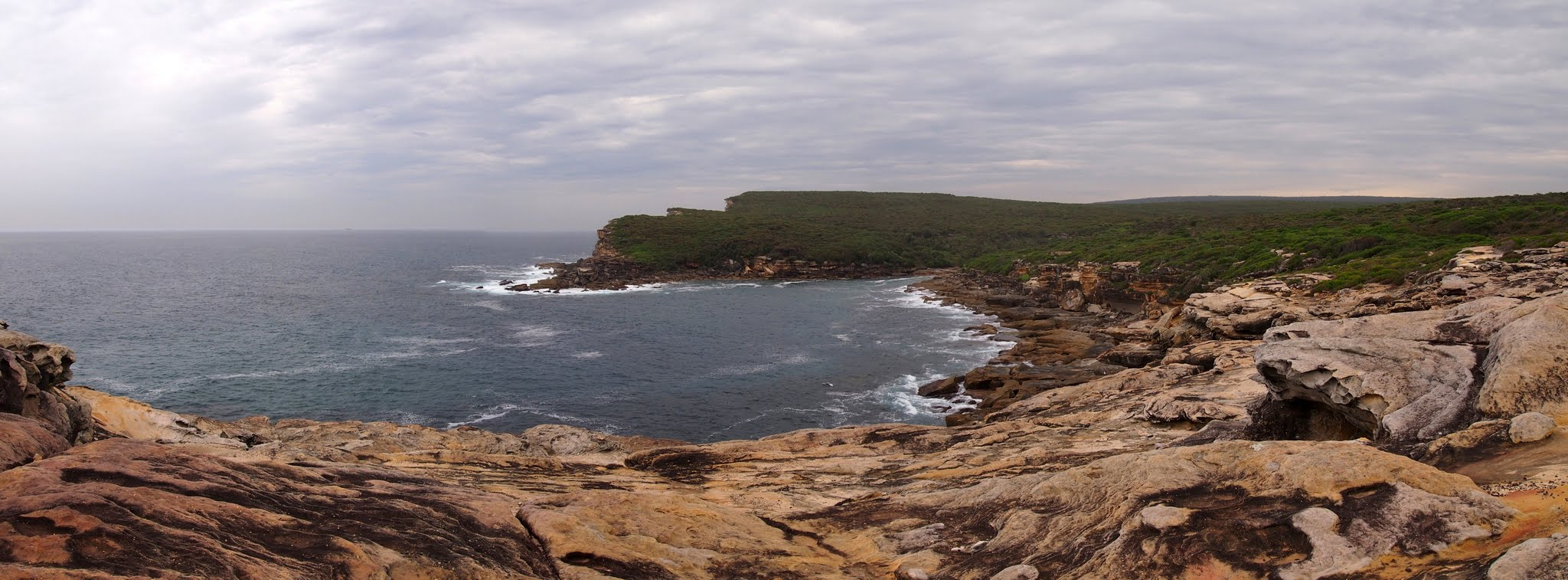
Coast Track (#42)

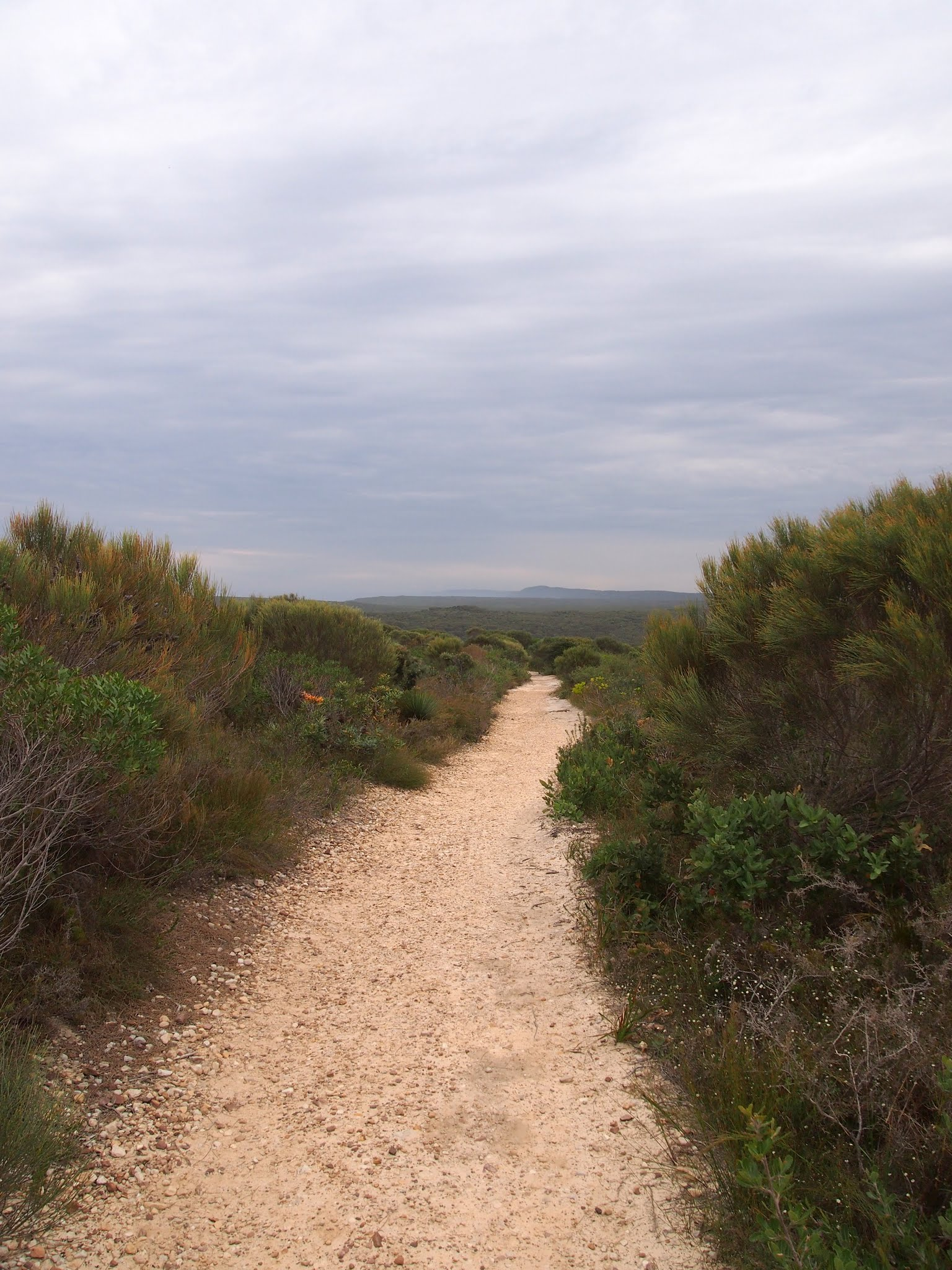
Coast Track (#43)

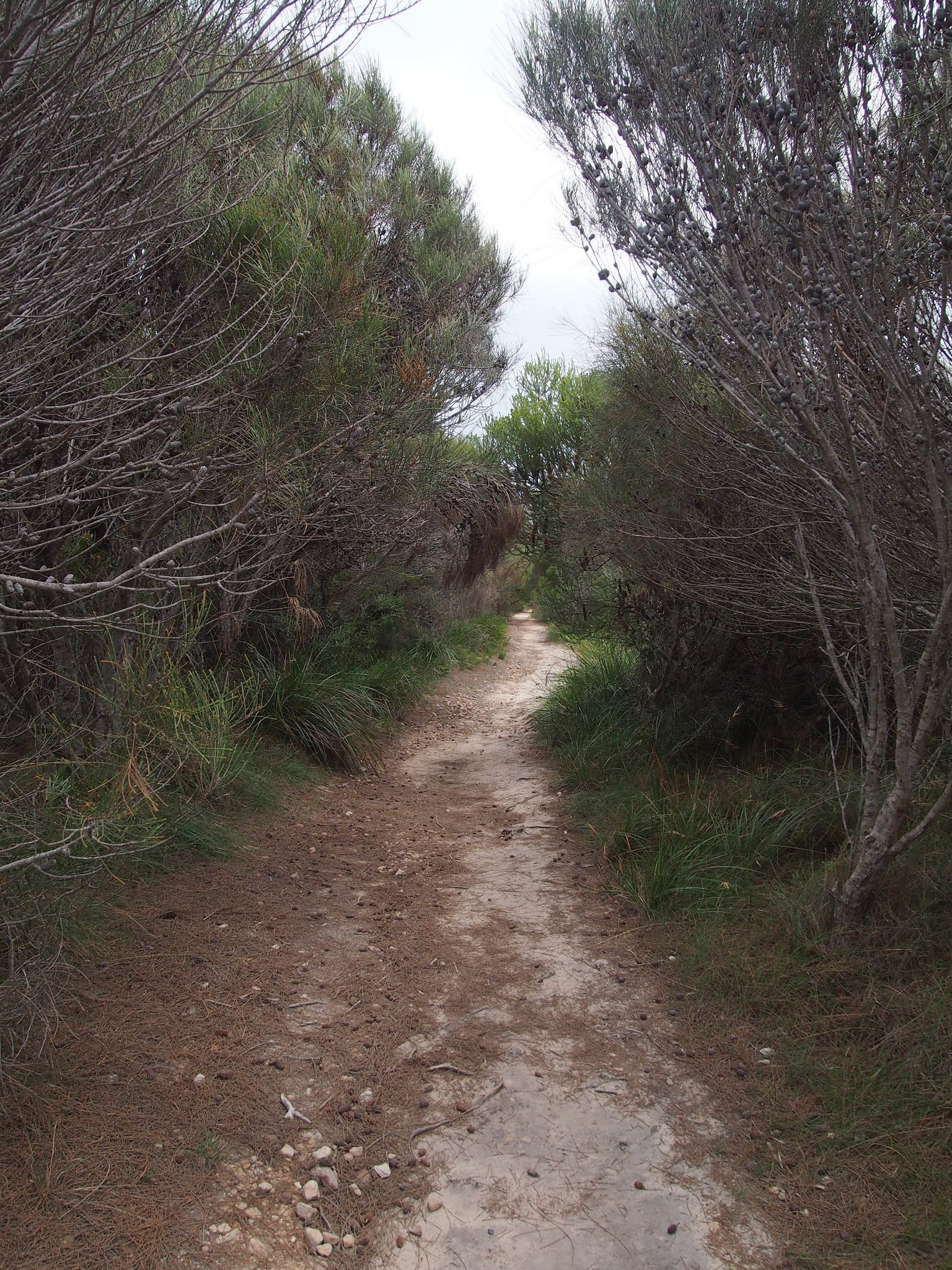
Coast Track (#44)

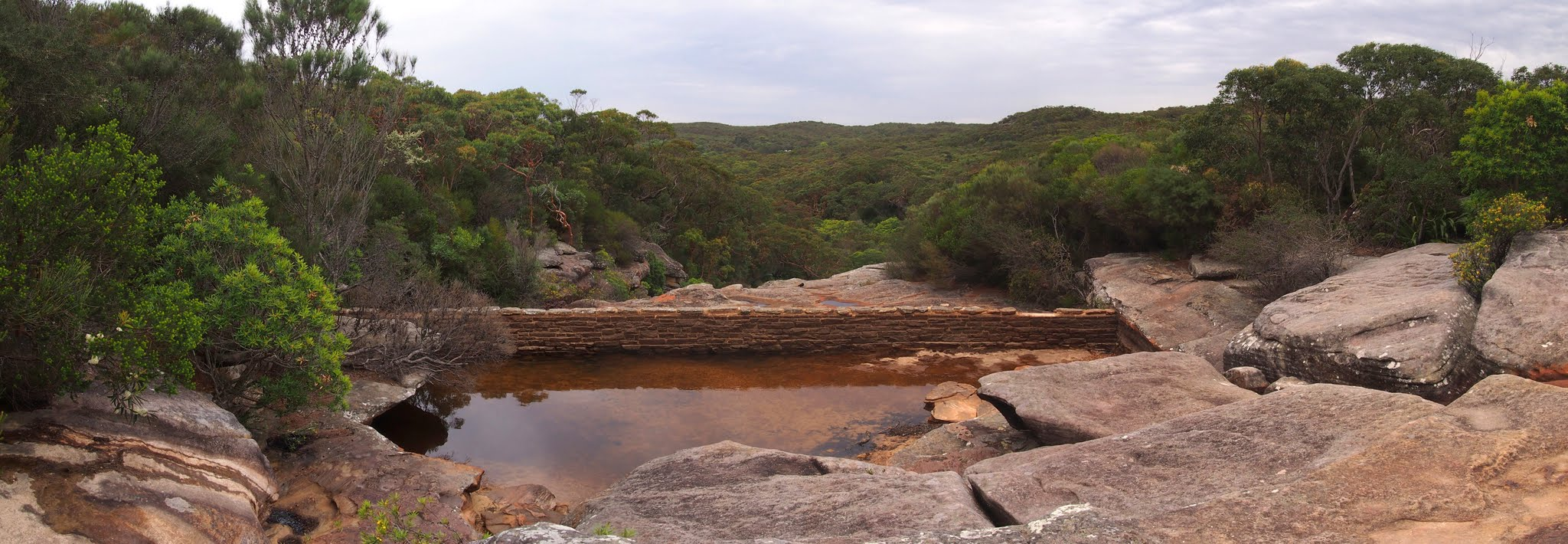
Coast Track (#45)

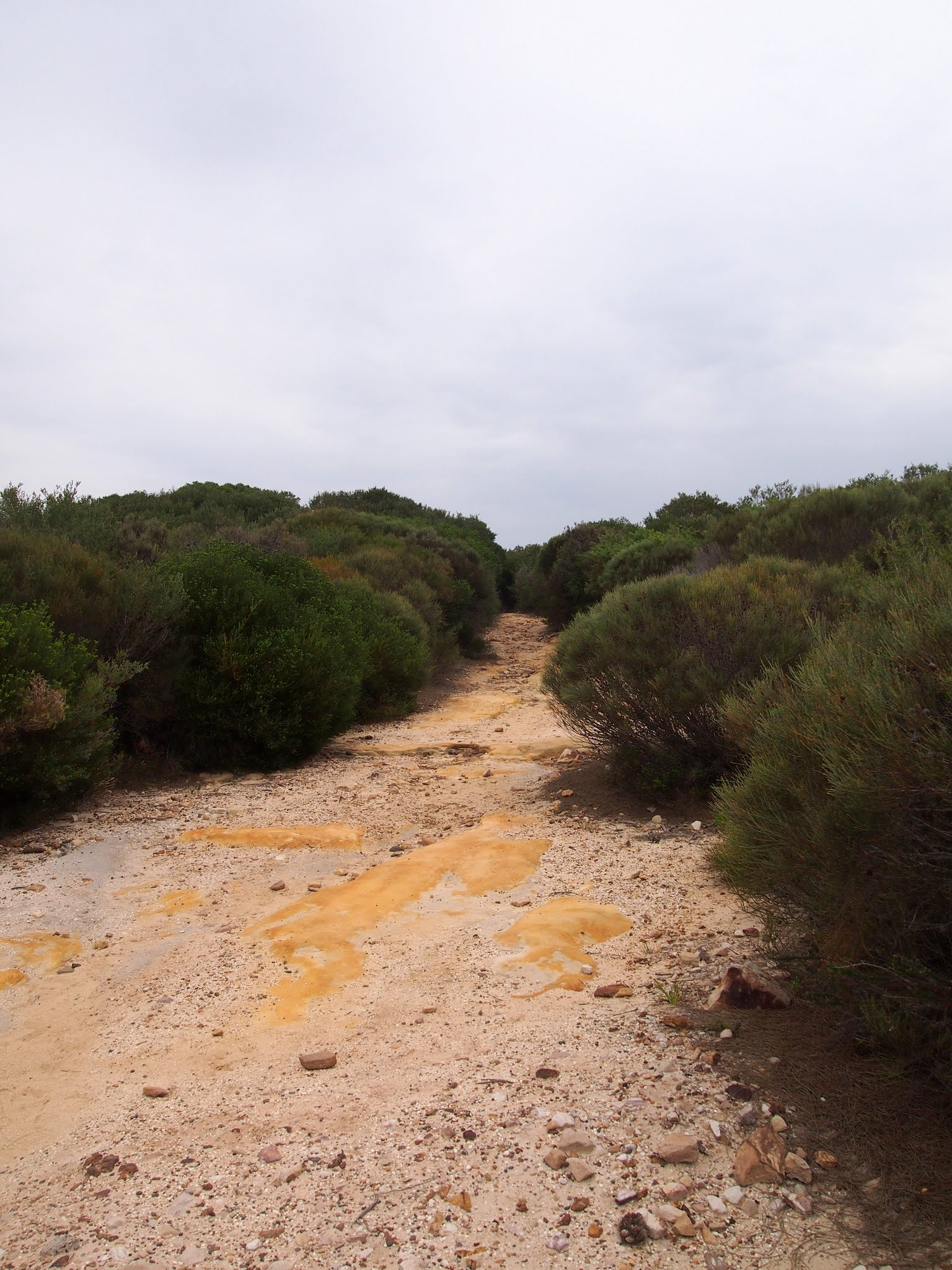
Coast Track (#46)

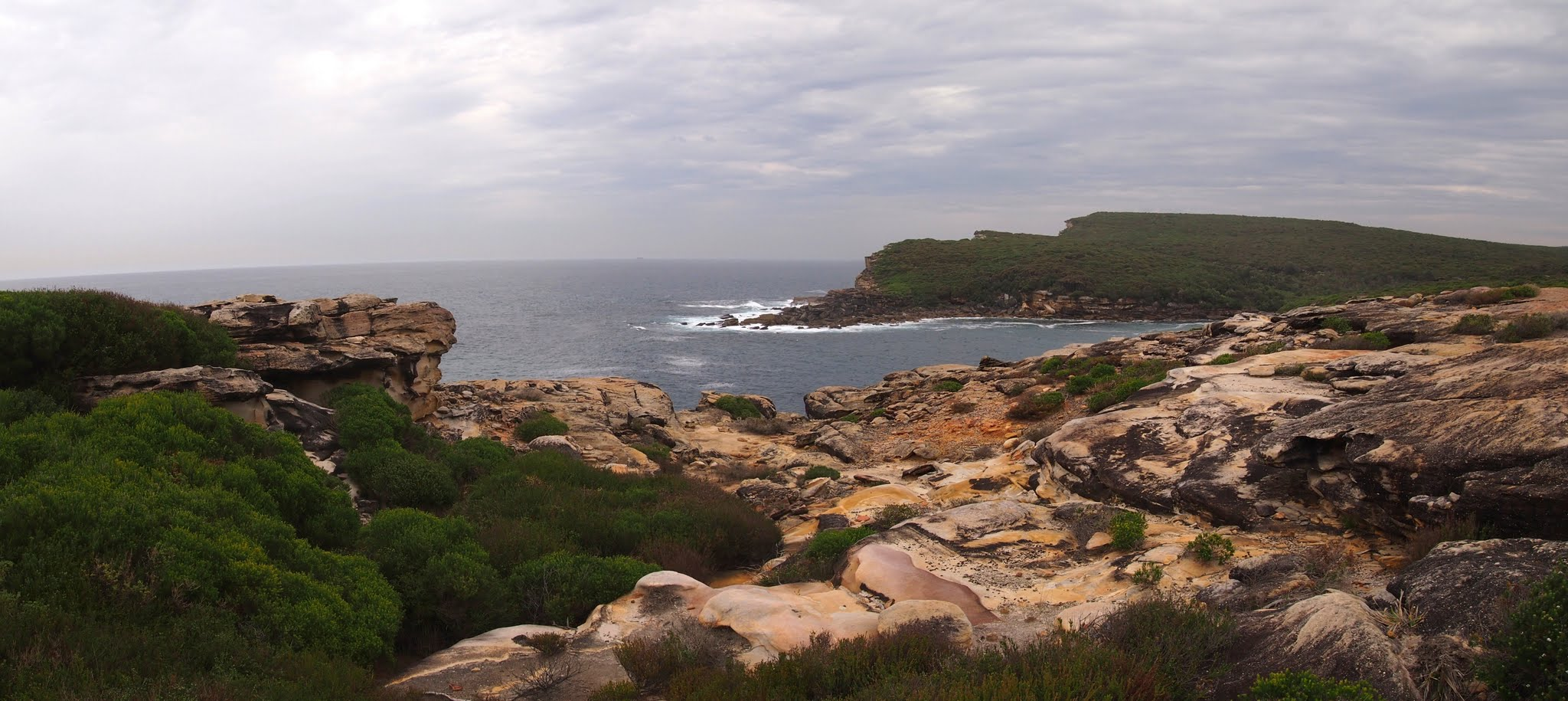
Coast Track (#47)

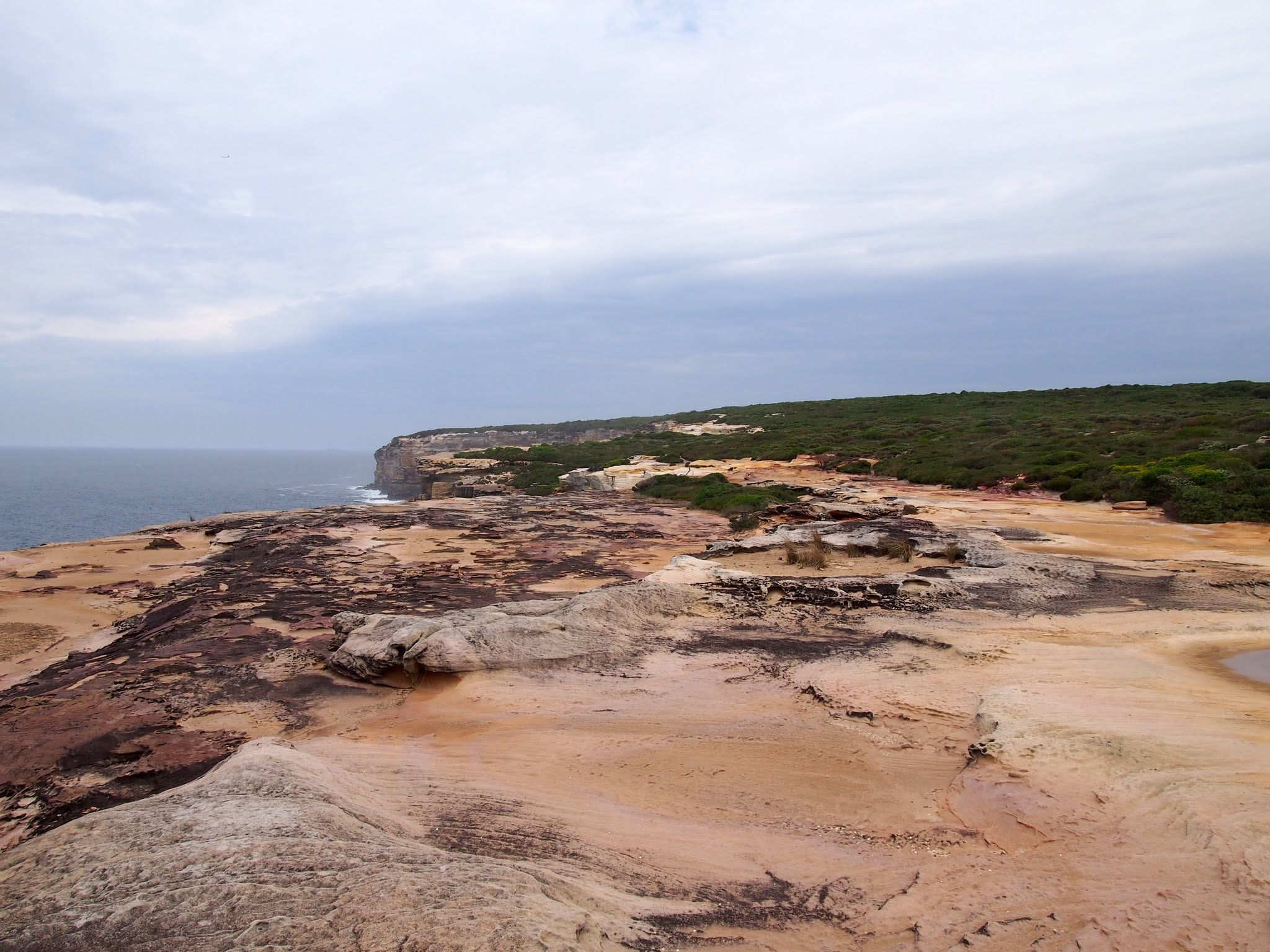
Coast Track (#48)

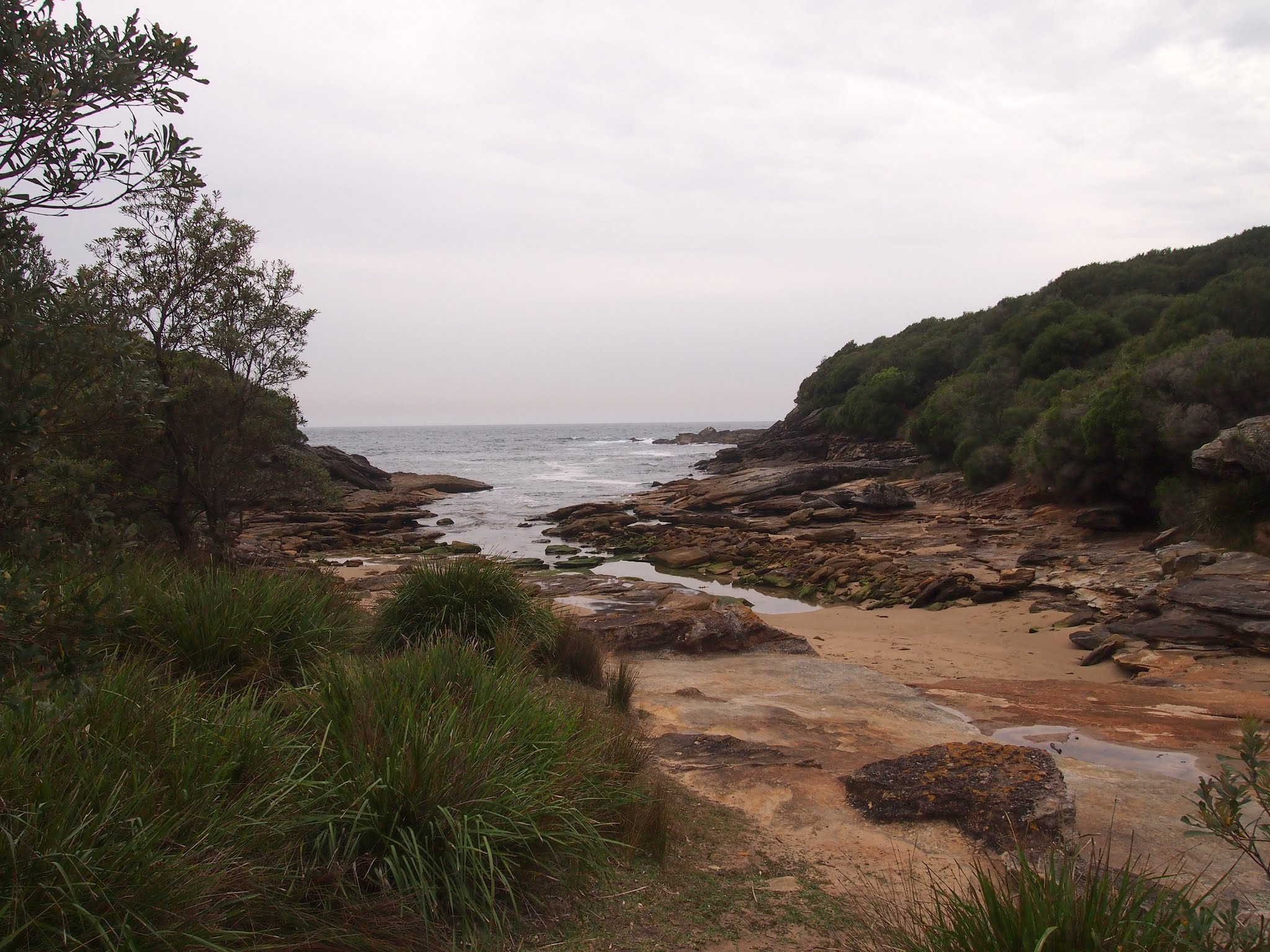
Coast Track (#49)

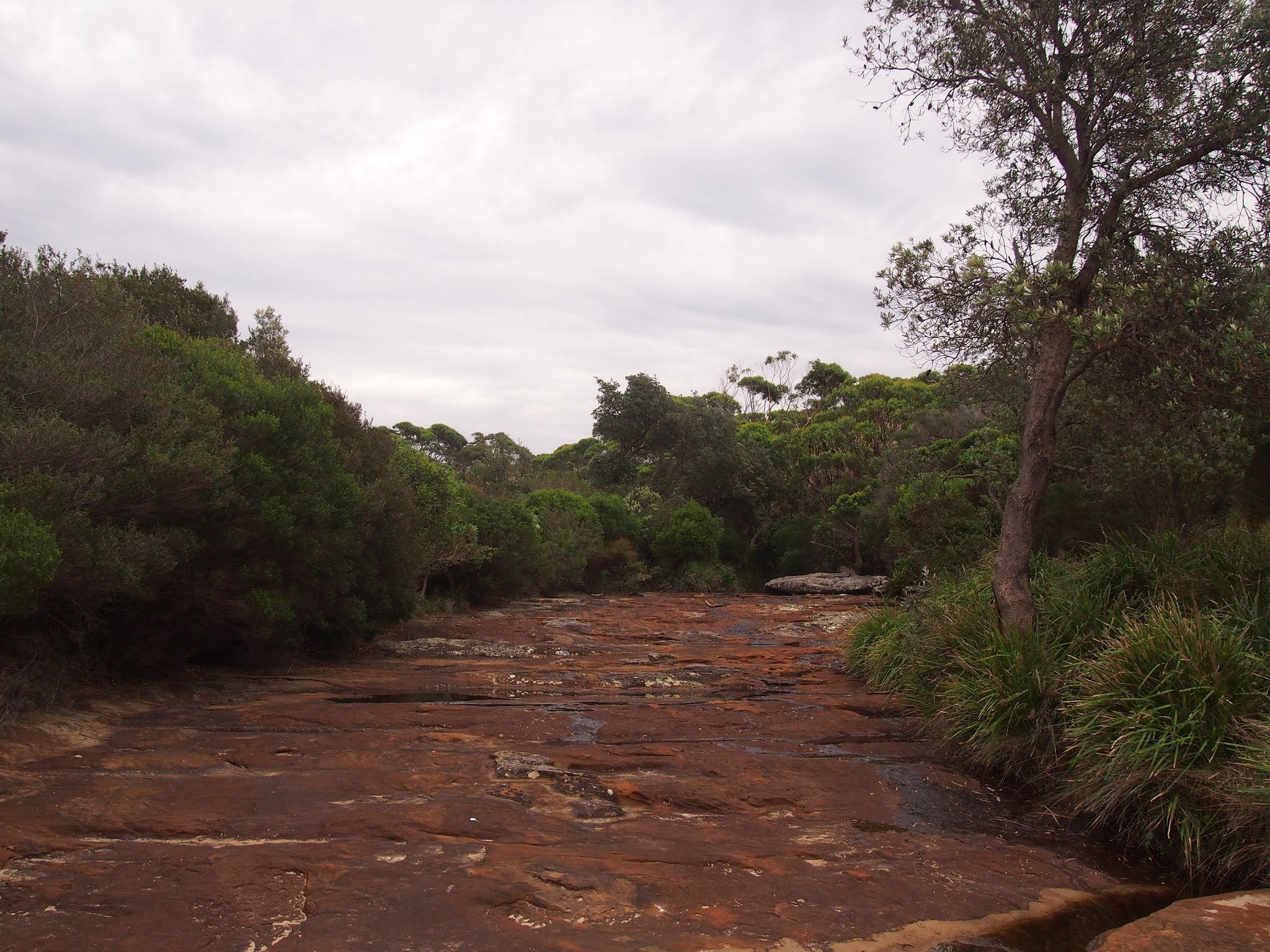
Coast Track (#50)

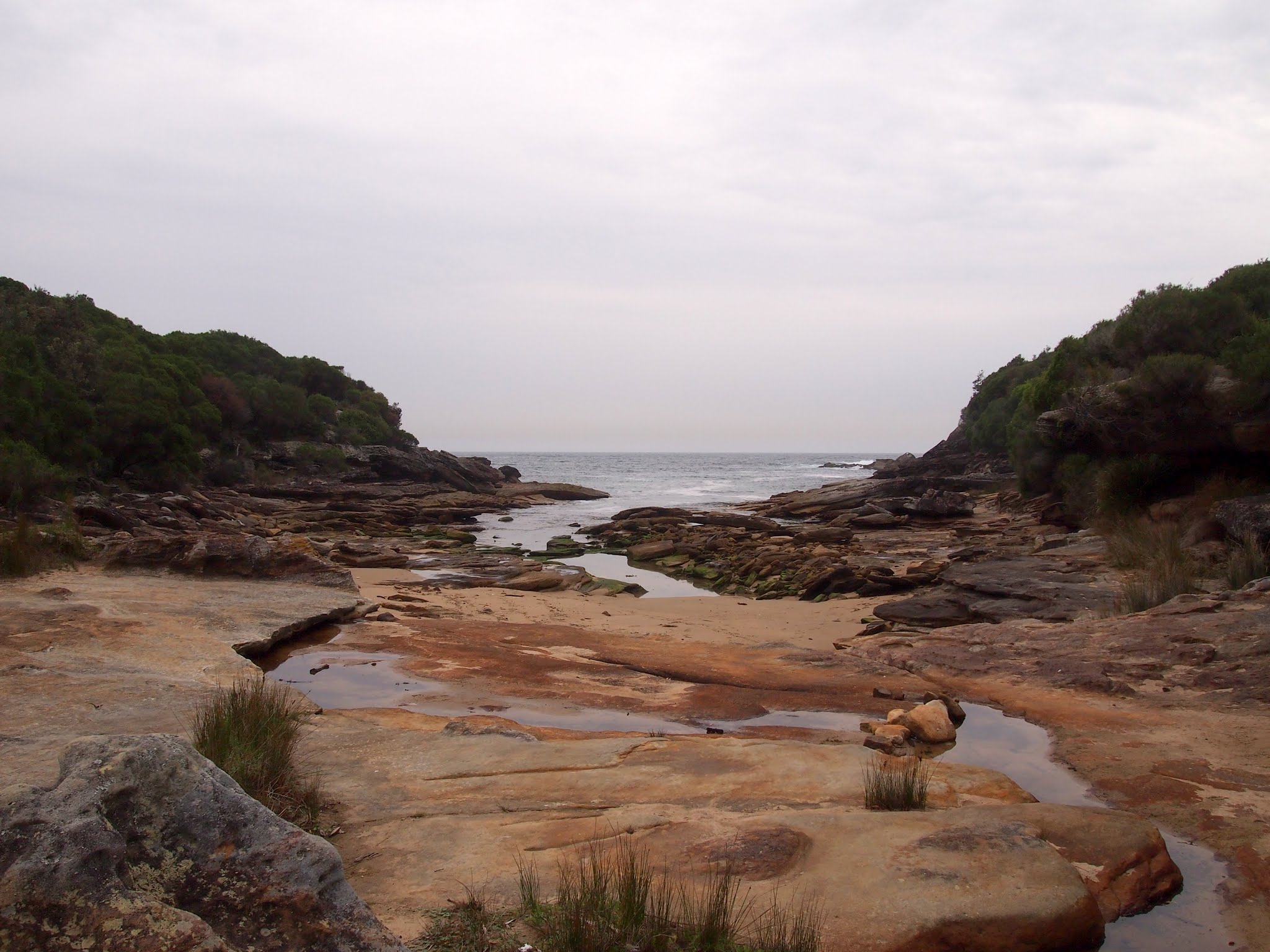
Coast Track (#51)

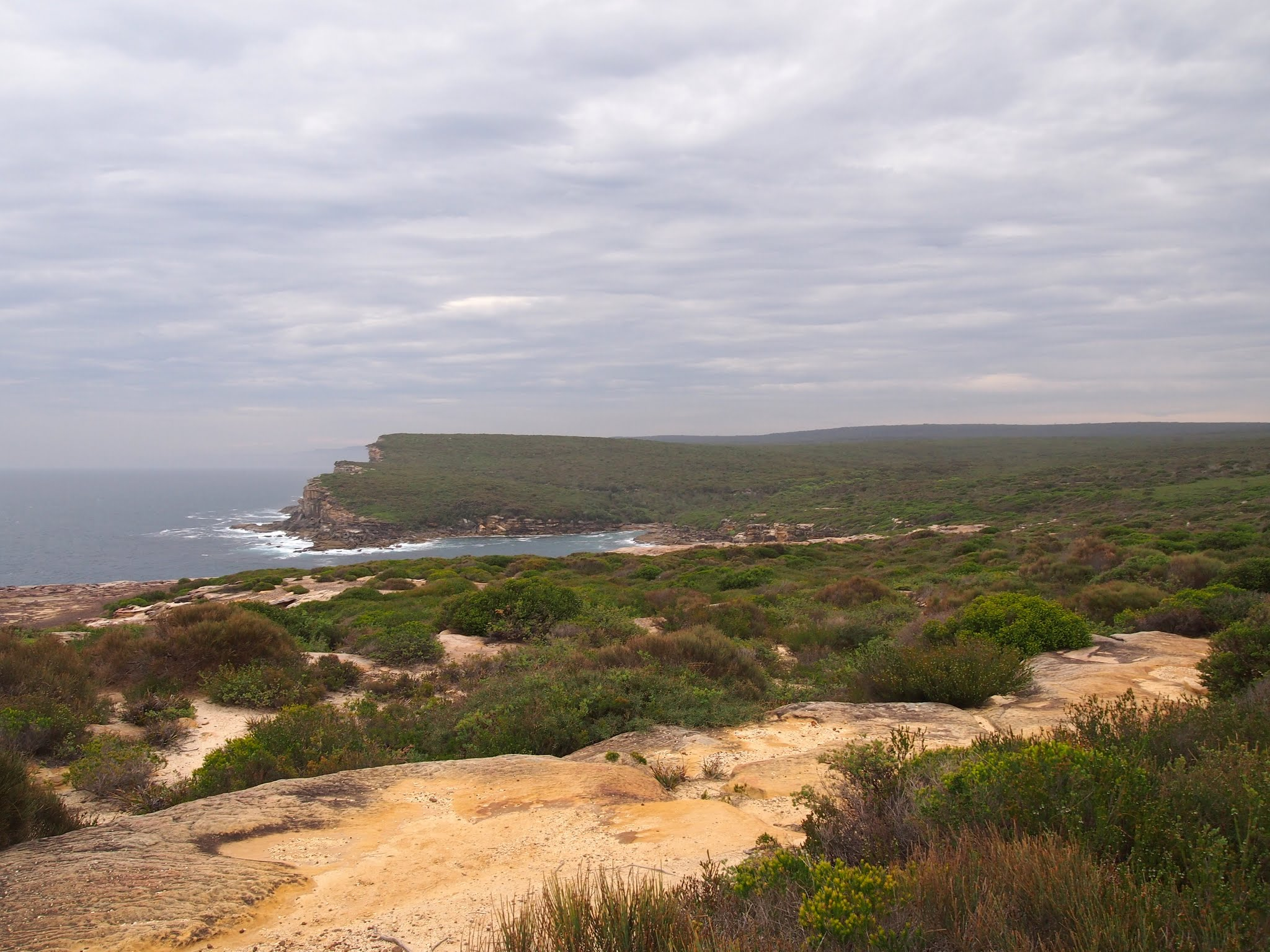
Coast Track (#52)

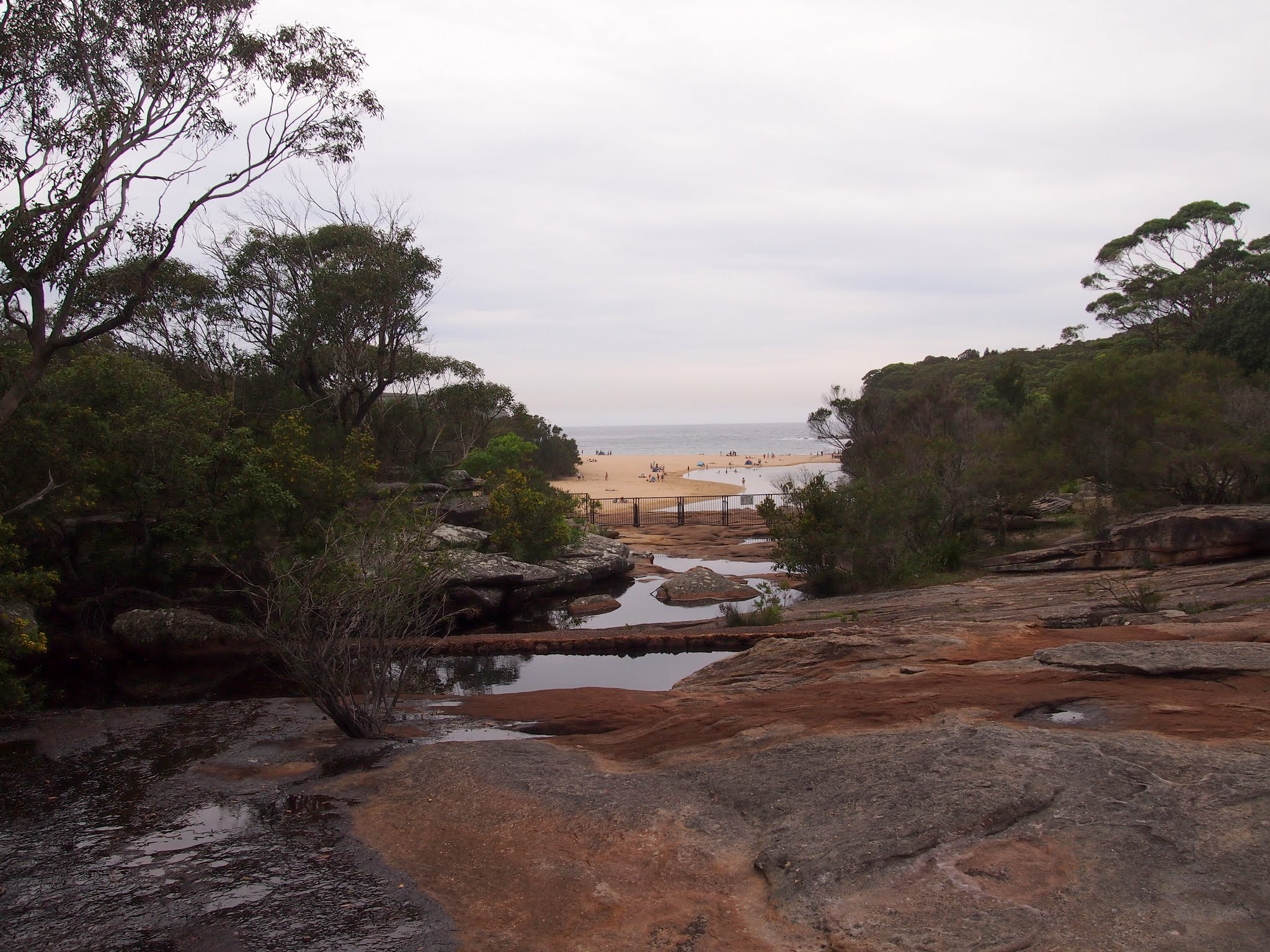
Coast Track (#53)

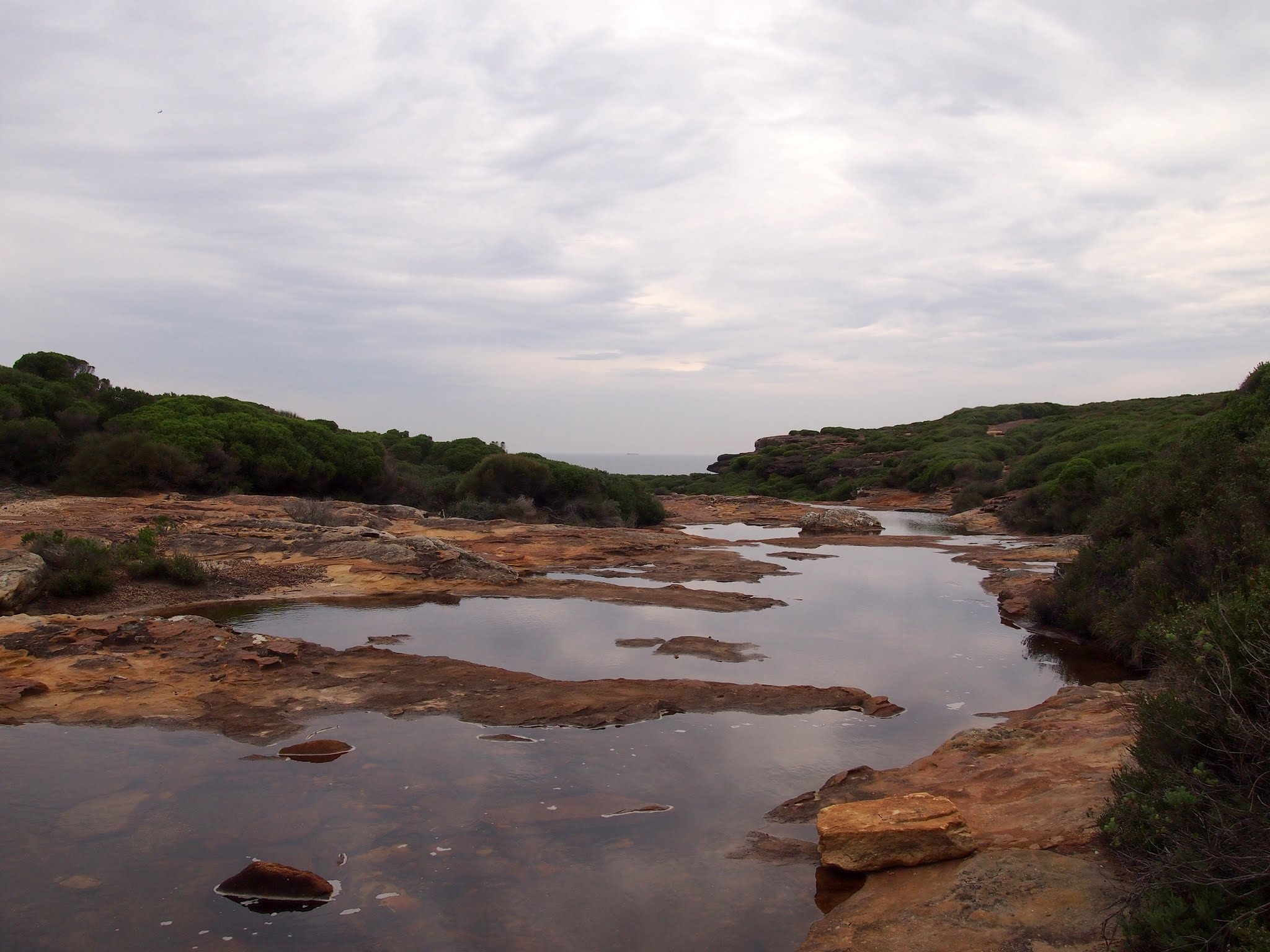
Coast Track (#54)

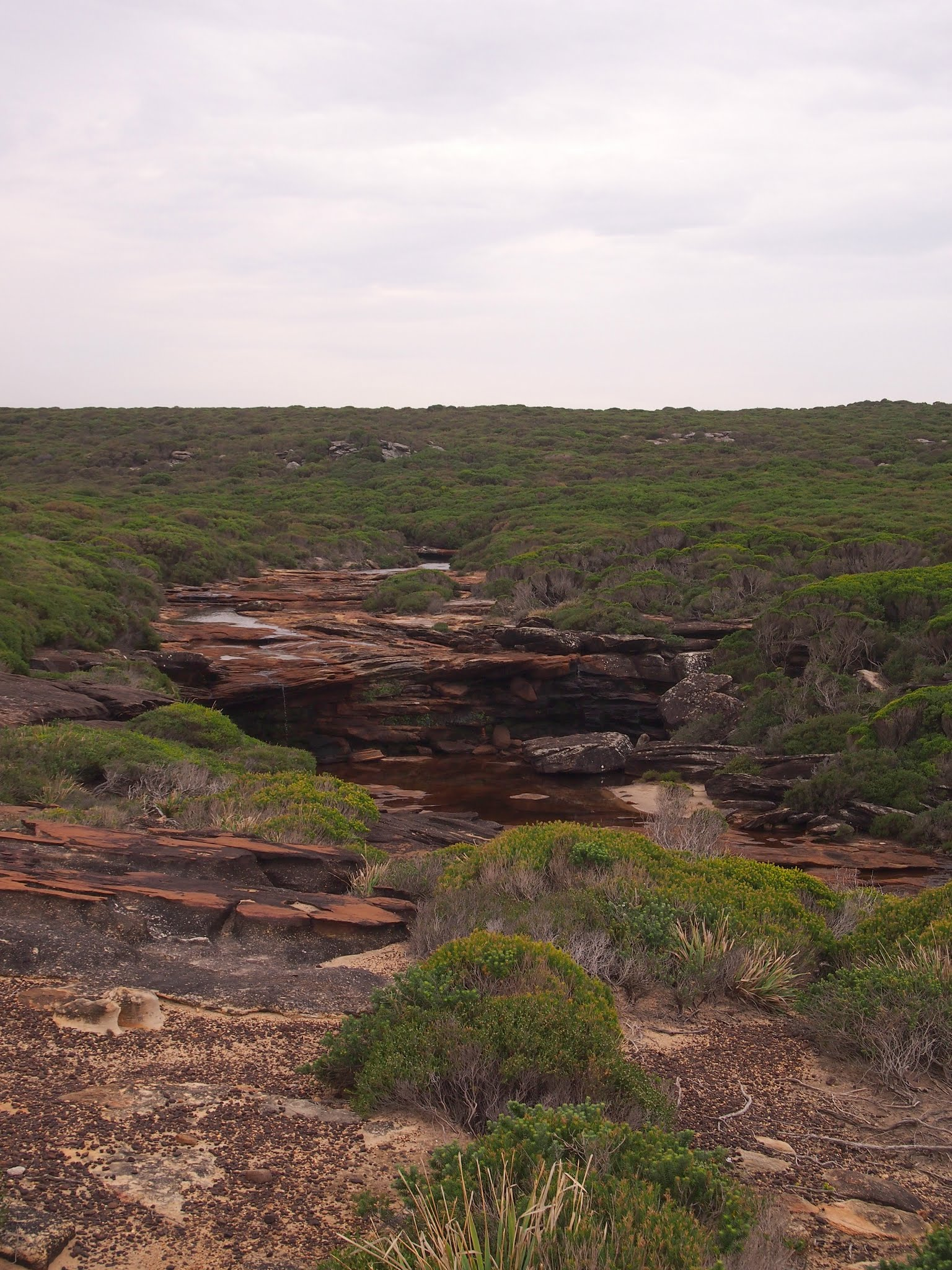
Coast Track (#55)

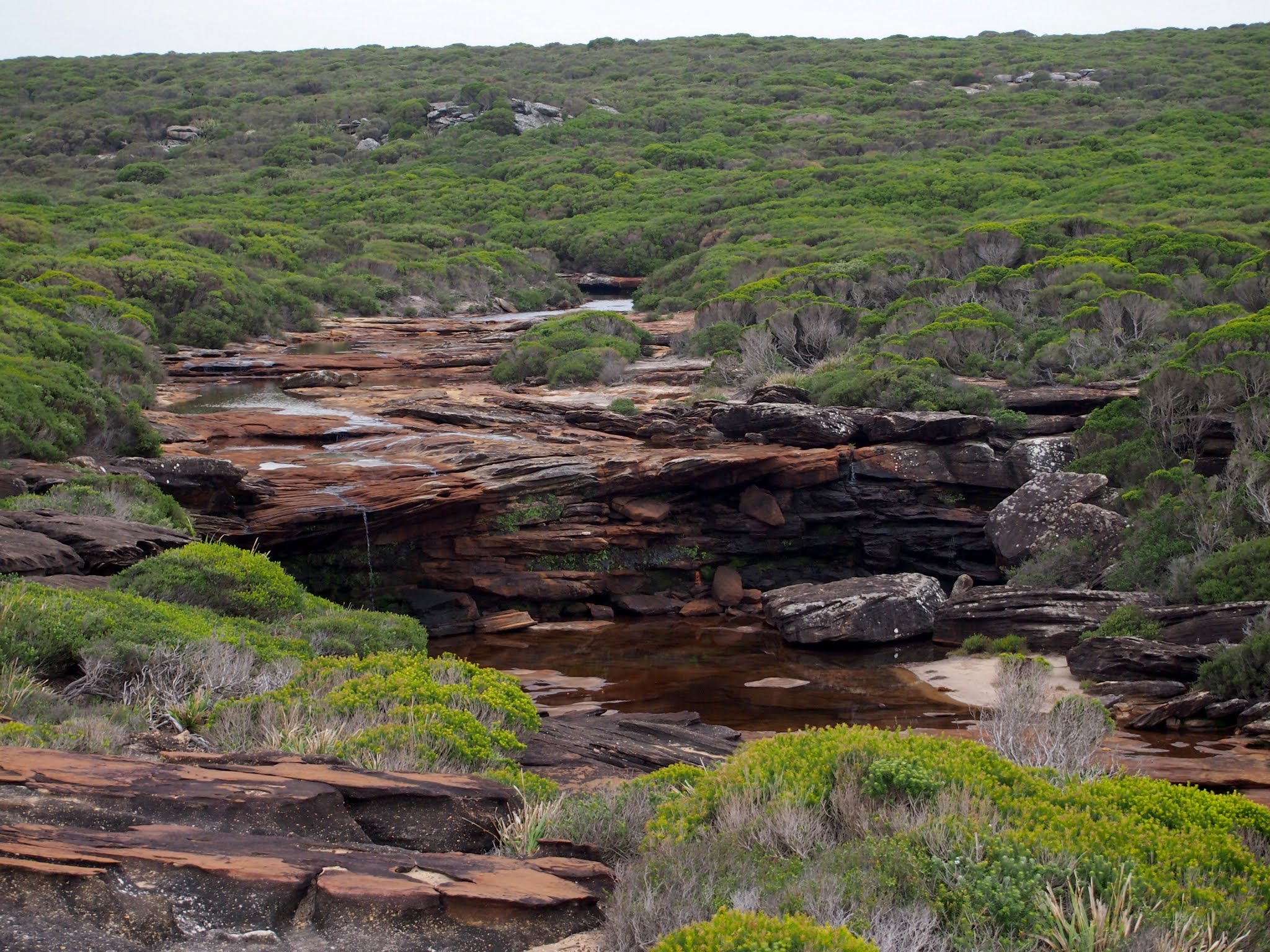
Coast Track (#56)

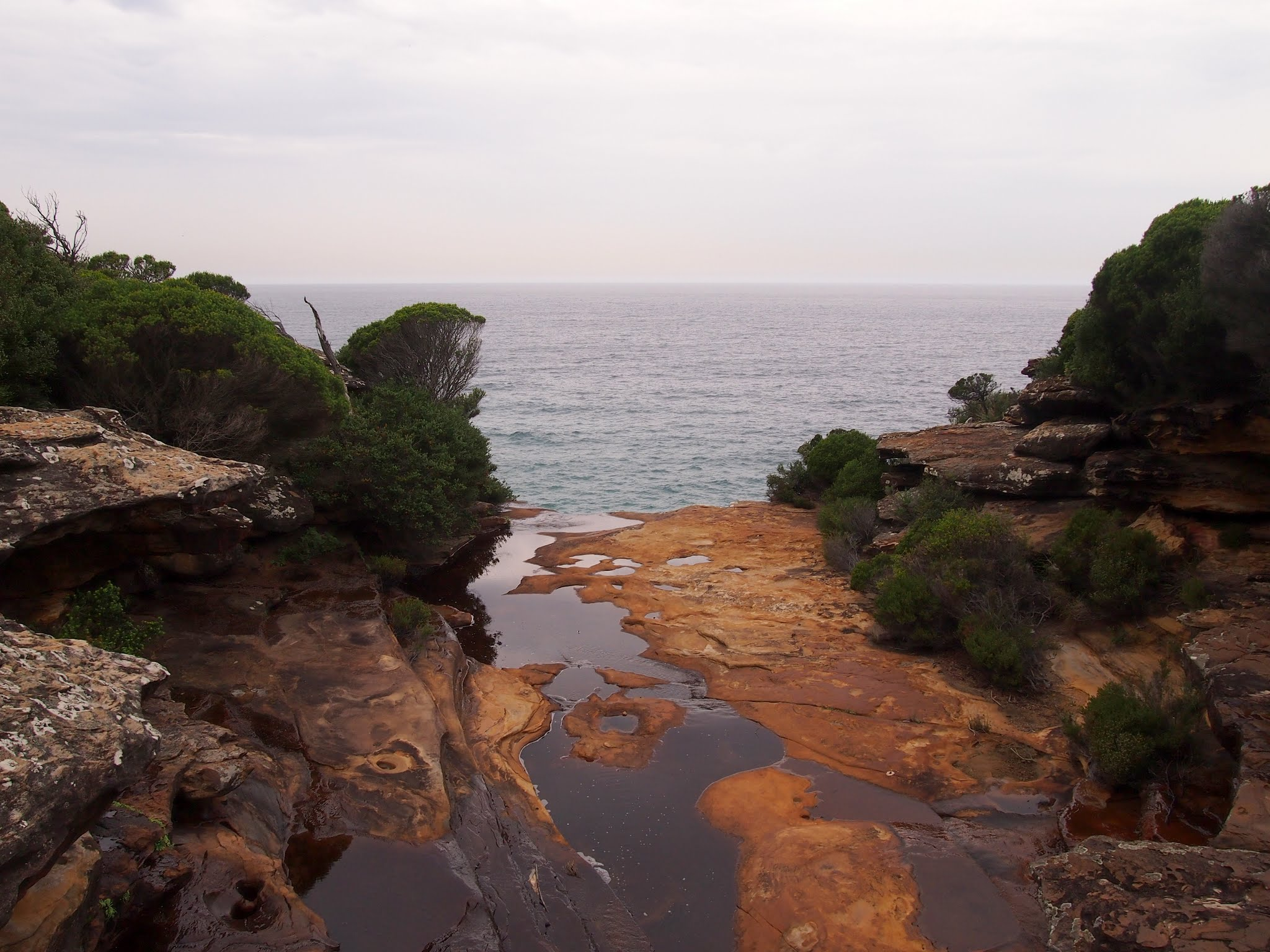
Coast Track (#57)

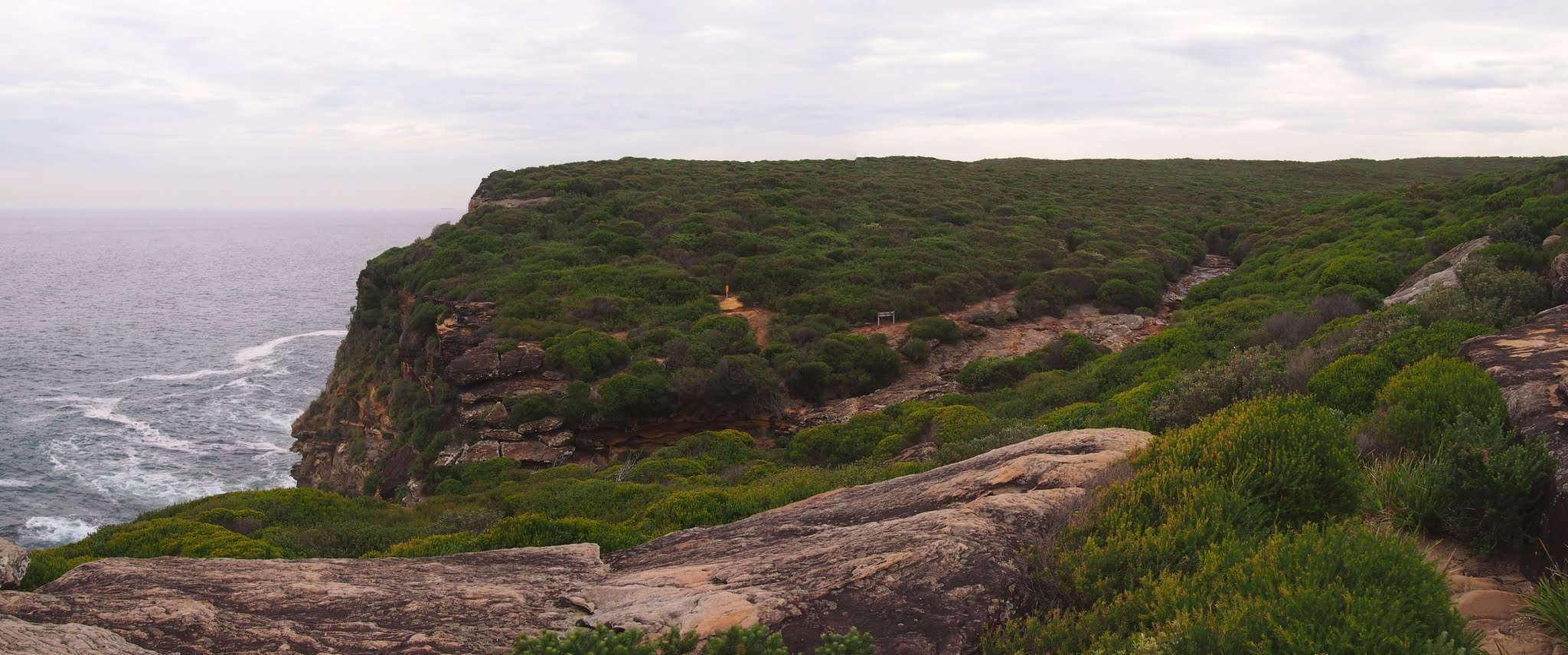
Coast Track (#58)

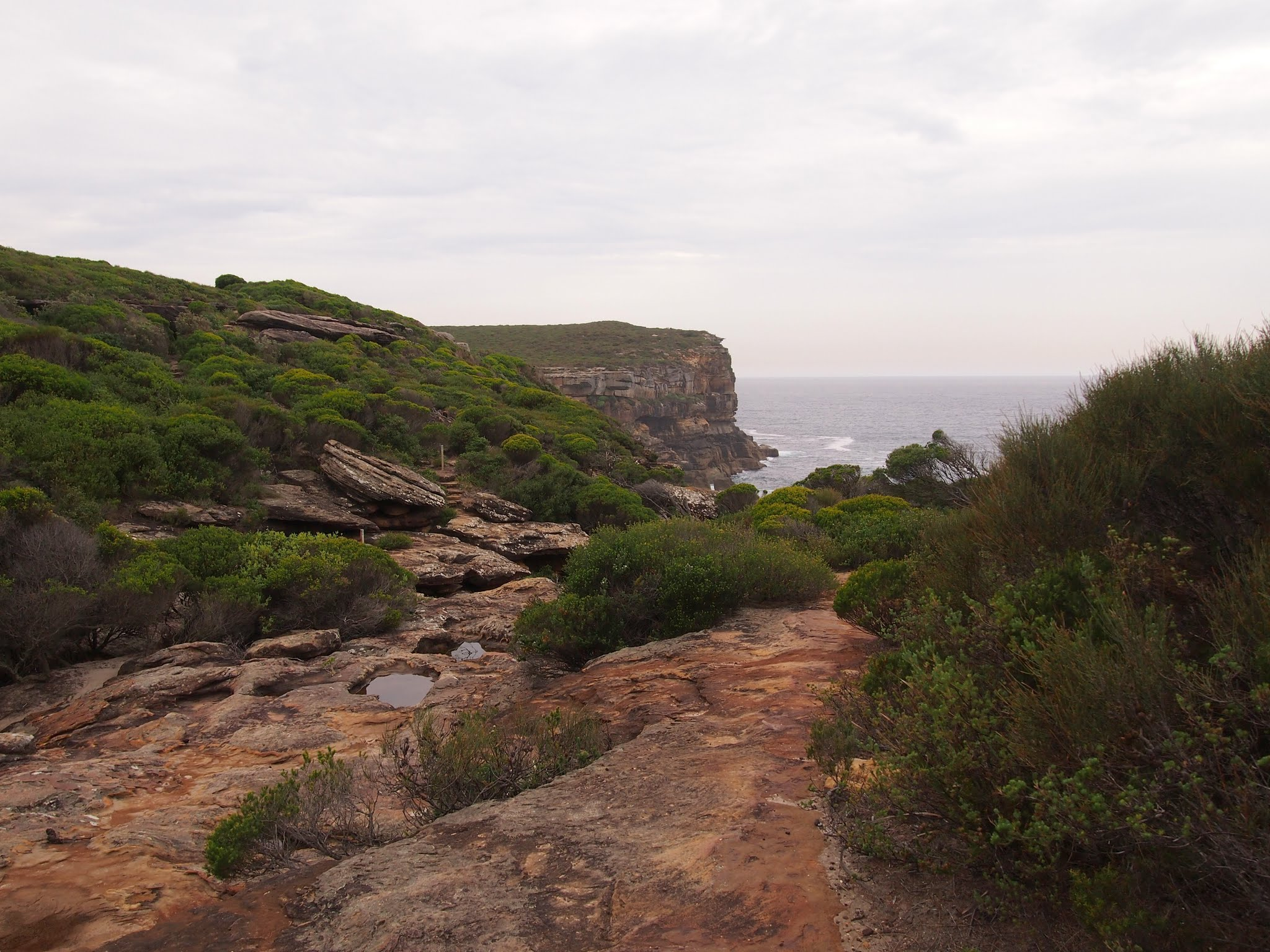
Coast Track (#59)

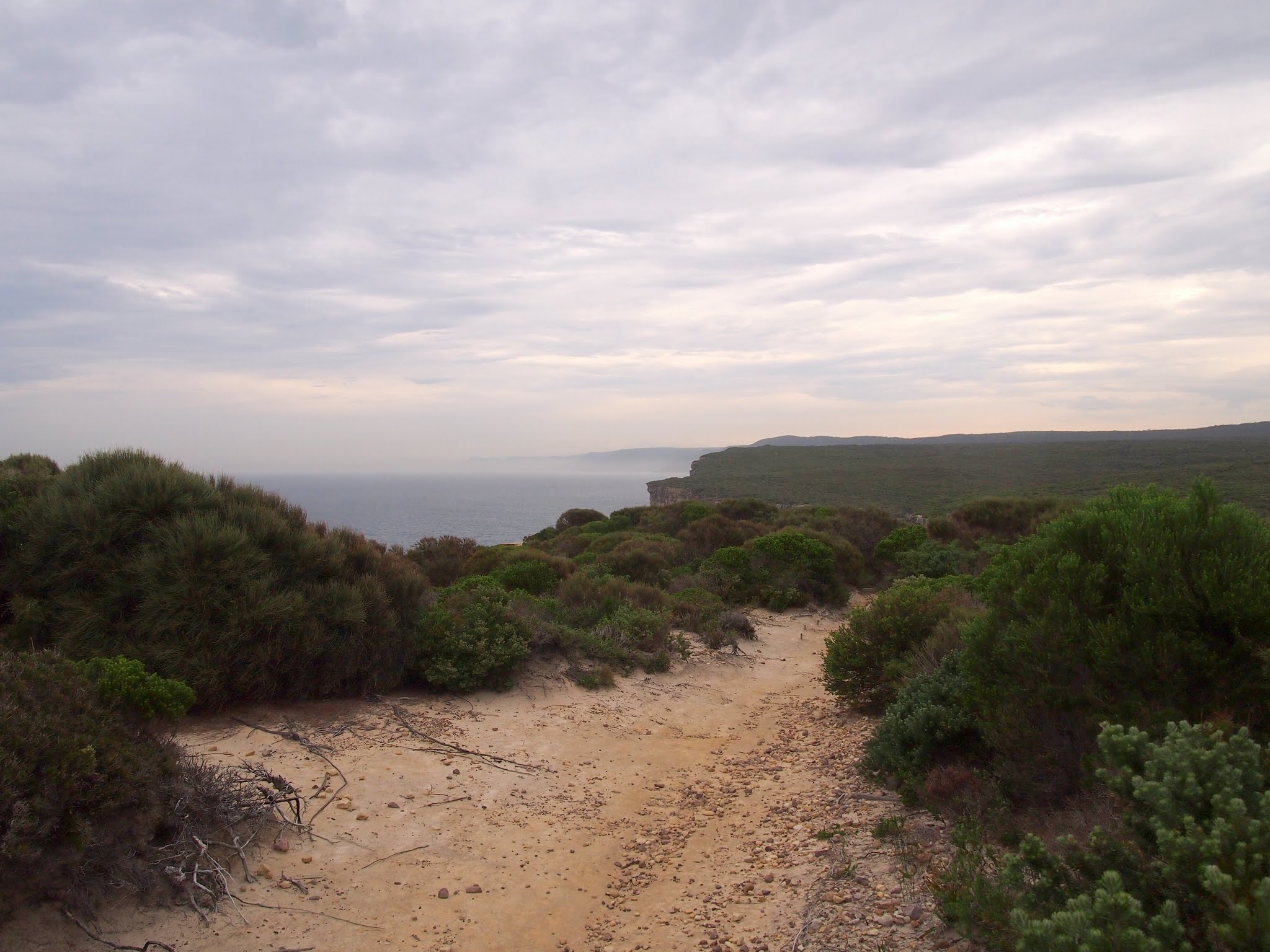
Coast Track (#60)

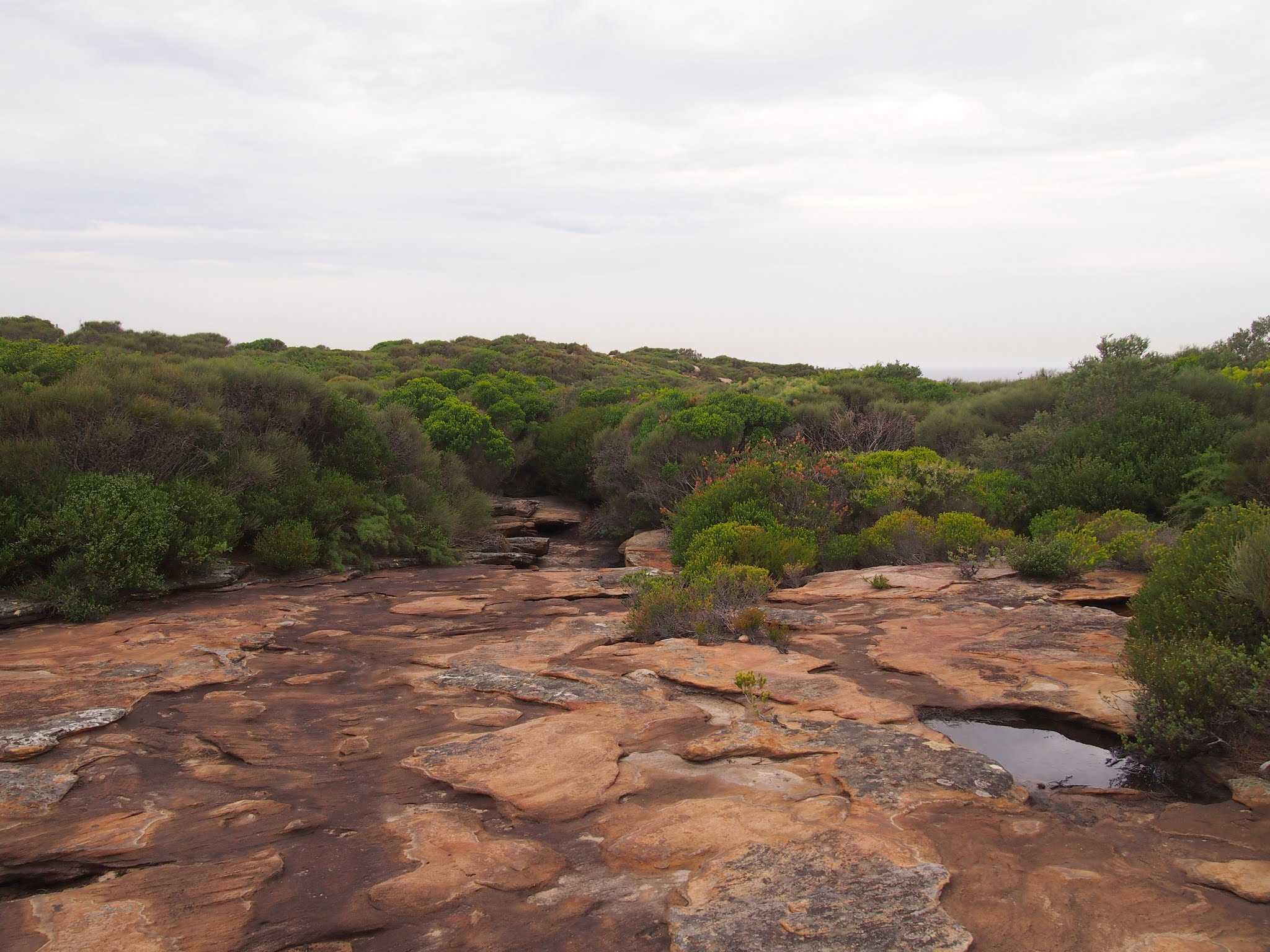
Coast Track (#61)

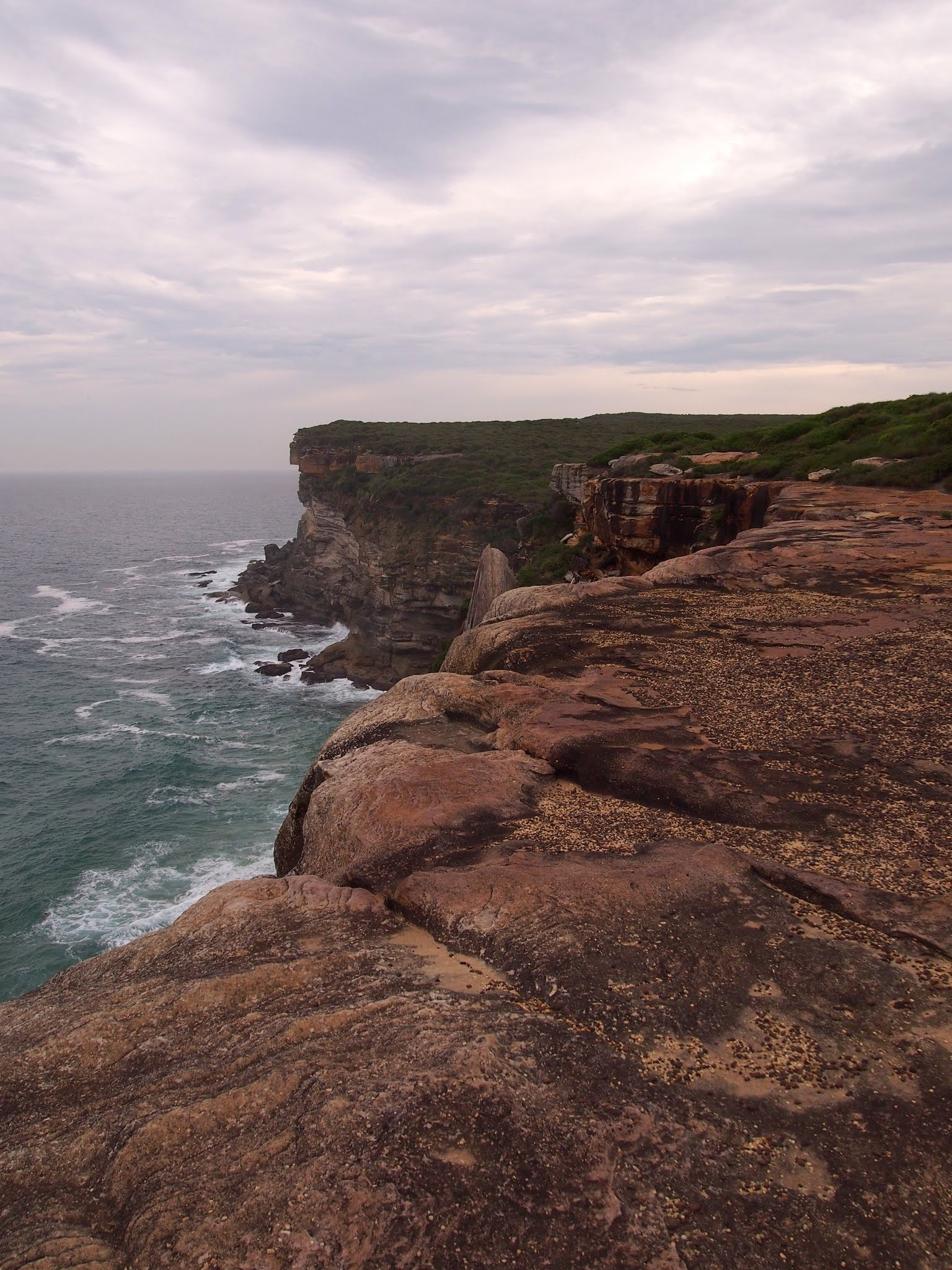
Coast Track (#62)

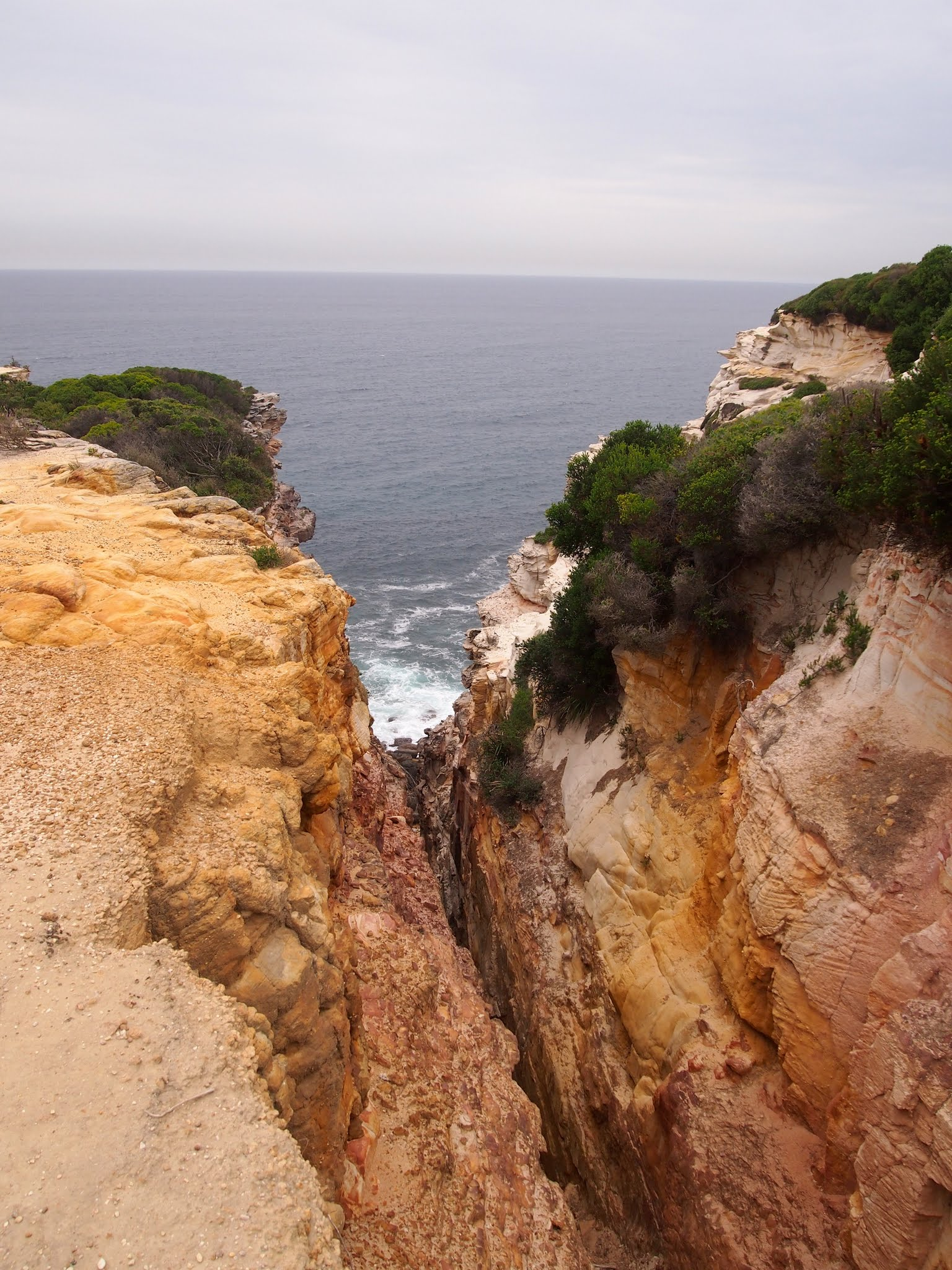
Coast Track (#63)

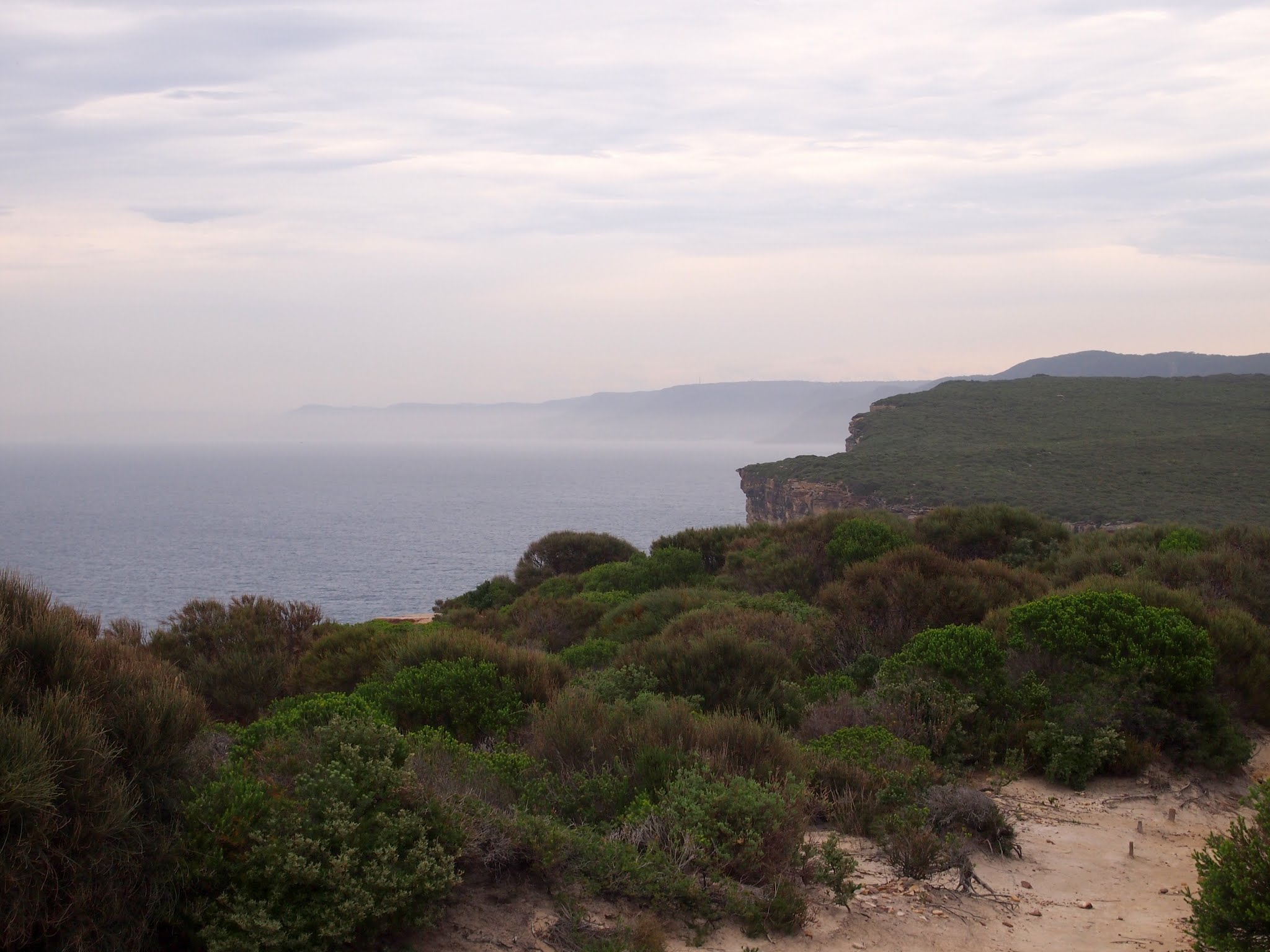
Coast Track (#64)

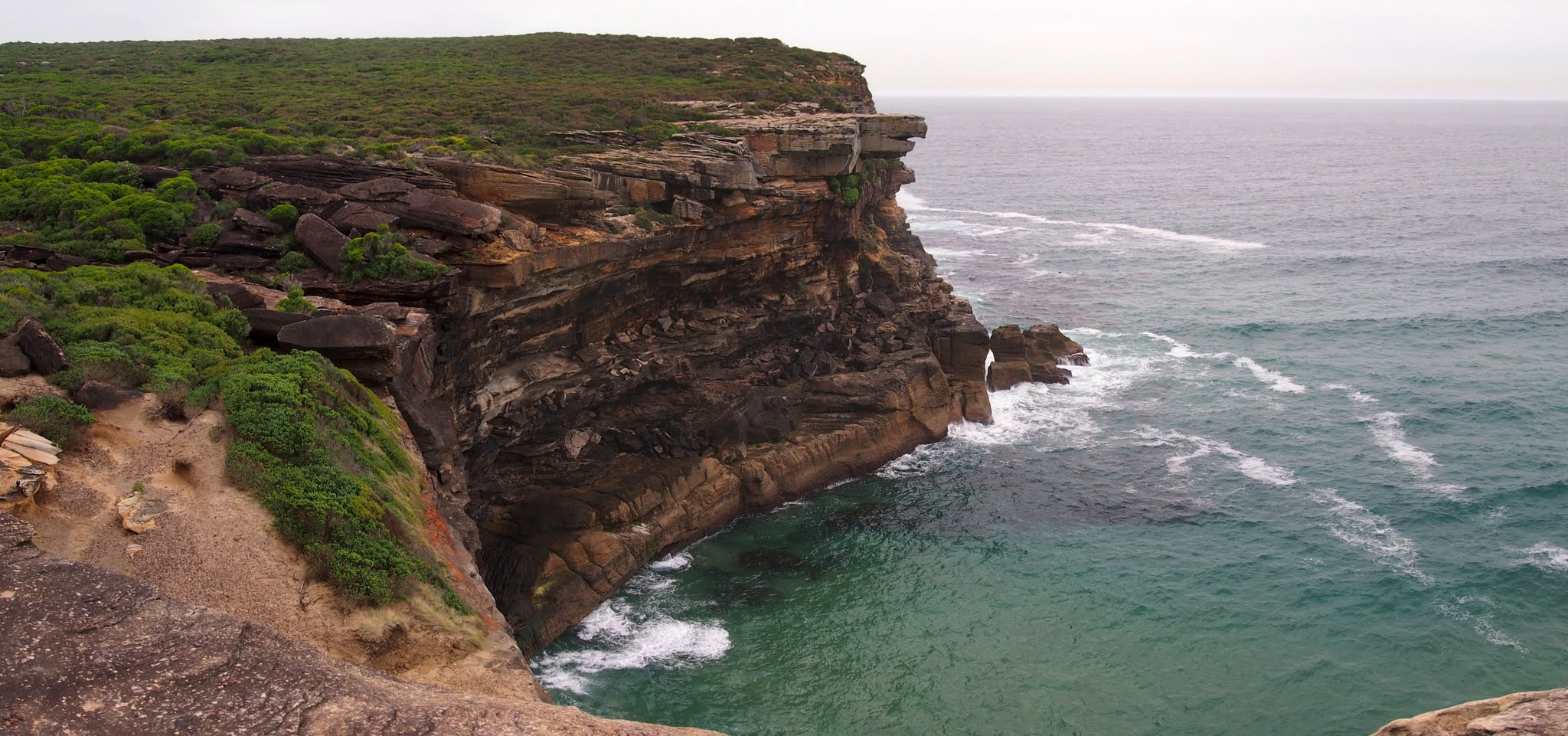
Coast Track (#65)

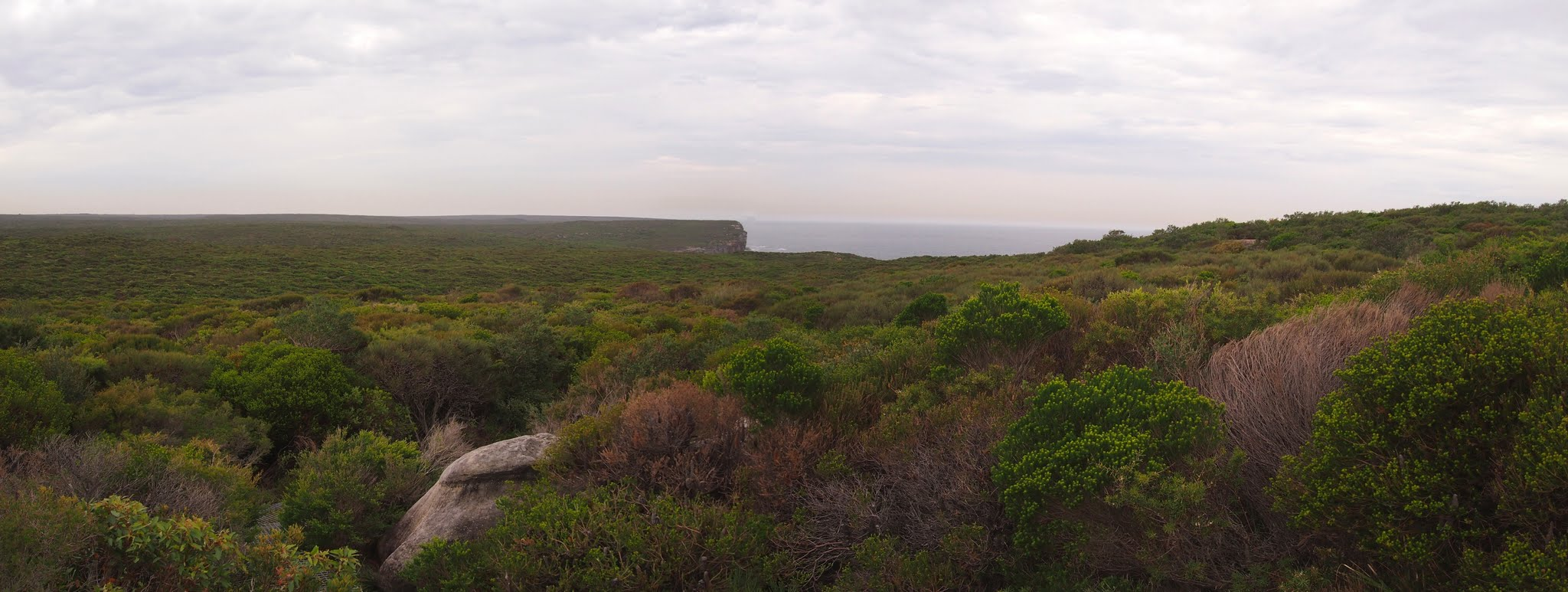
Coast Track (#66)

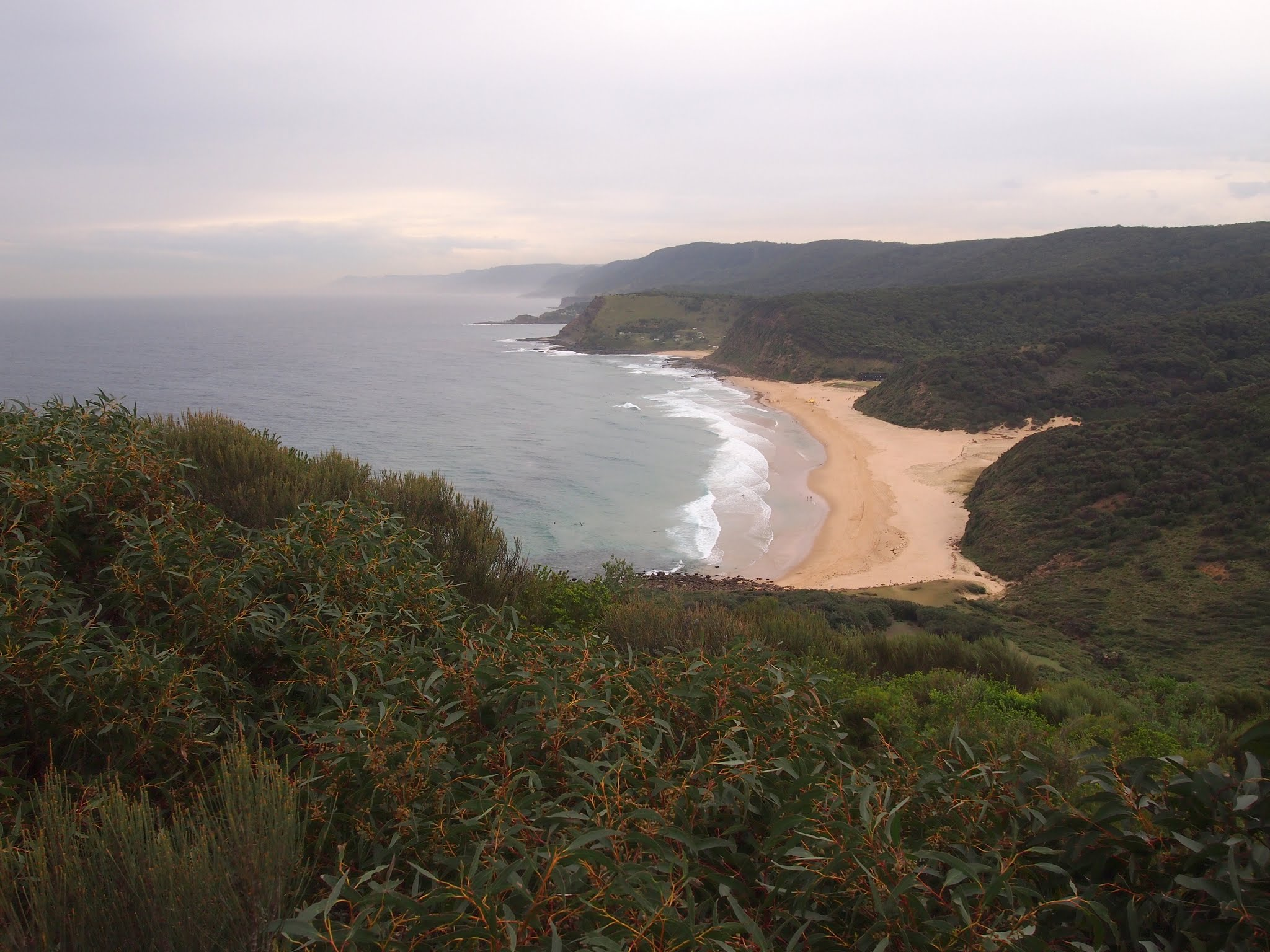
Coast Track (#67)

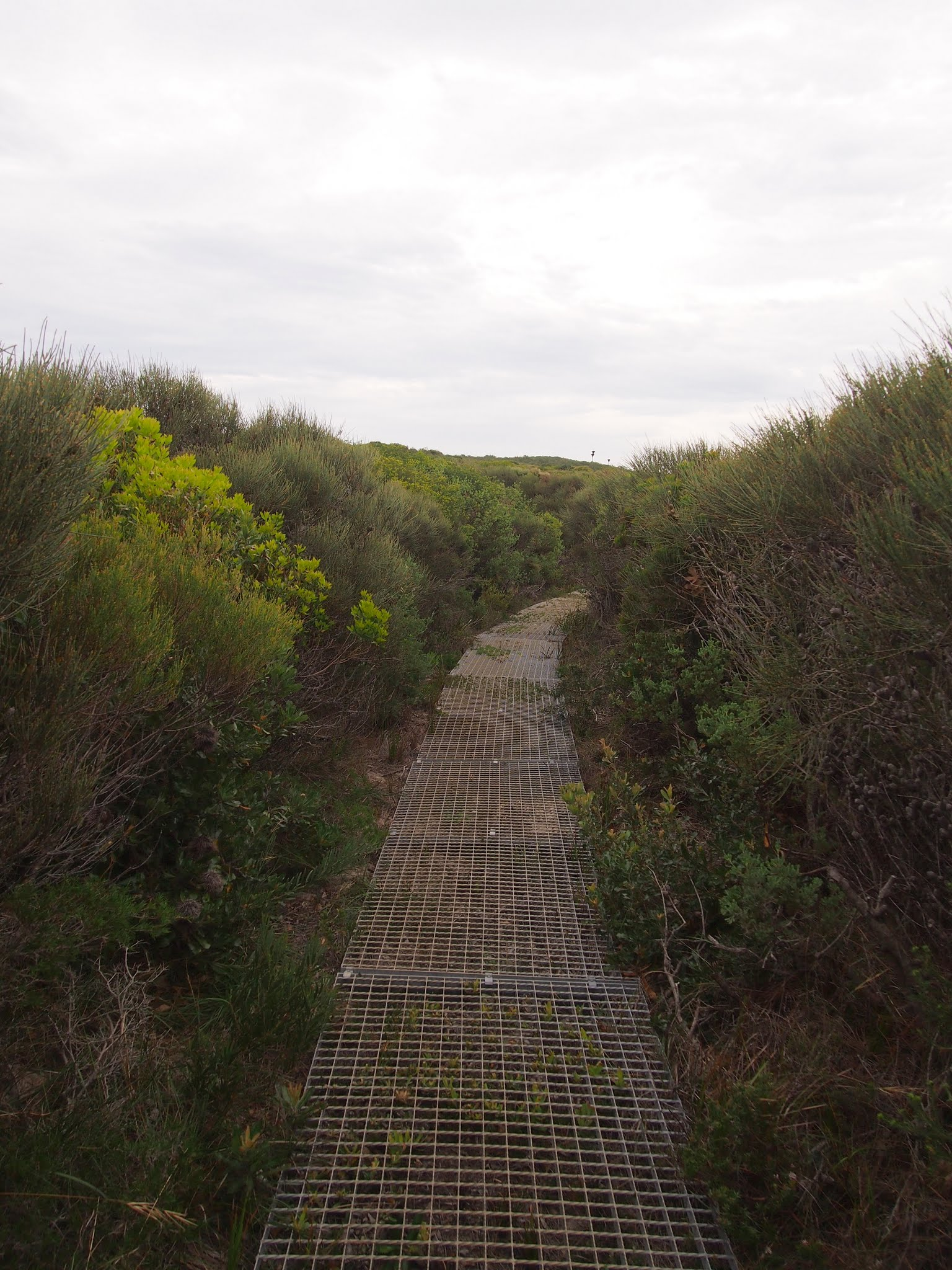
Coast Track (#68)

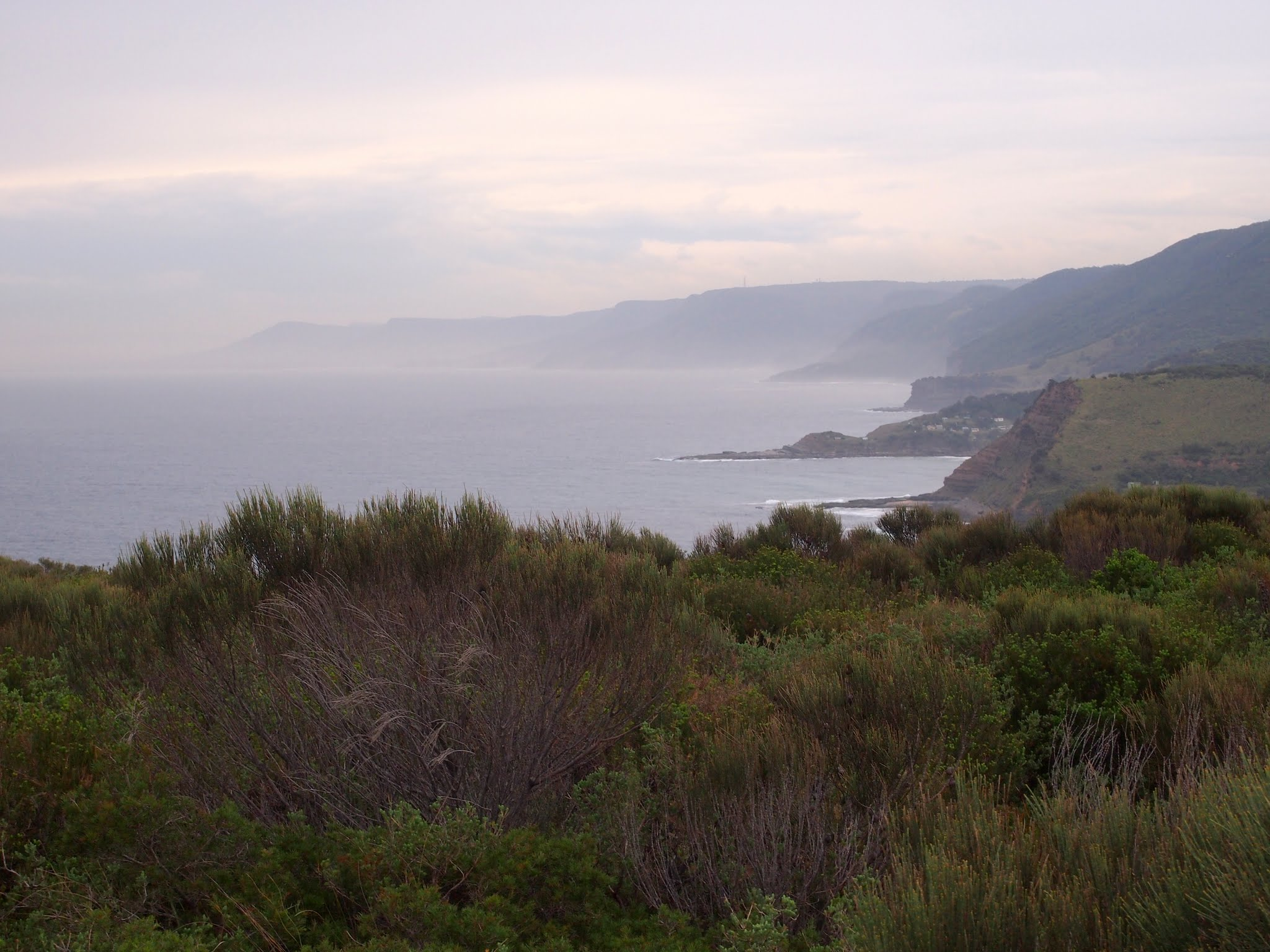
Coast Track (#69)

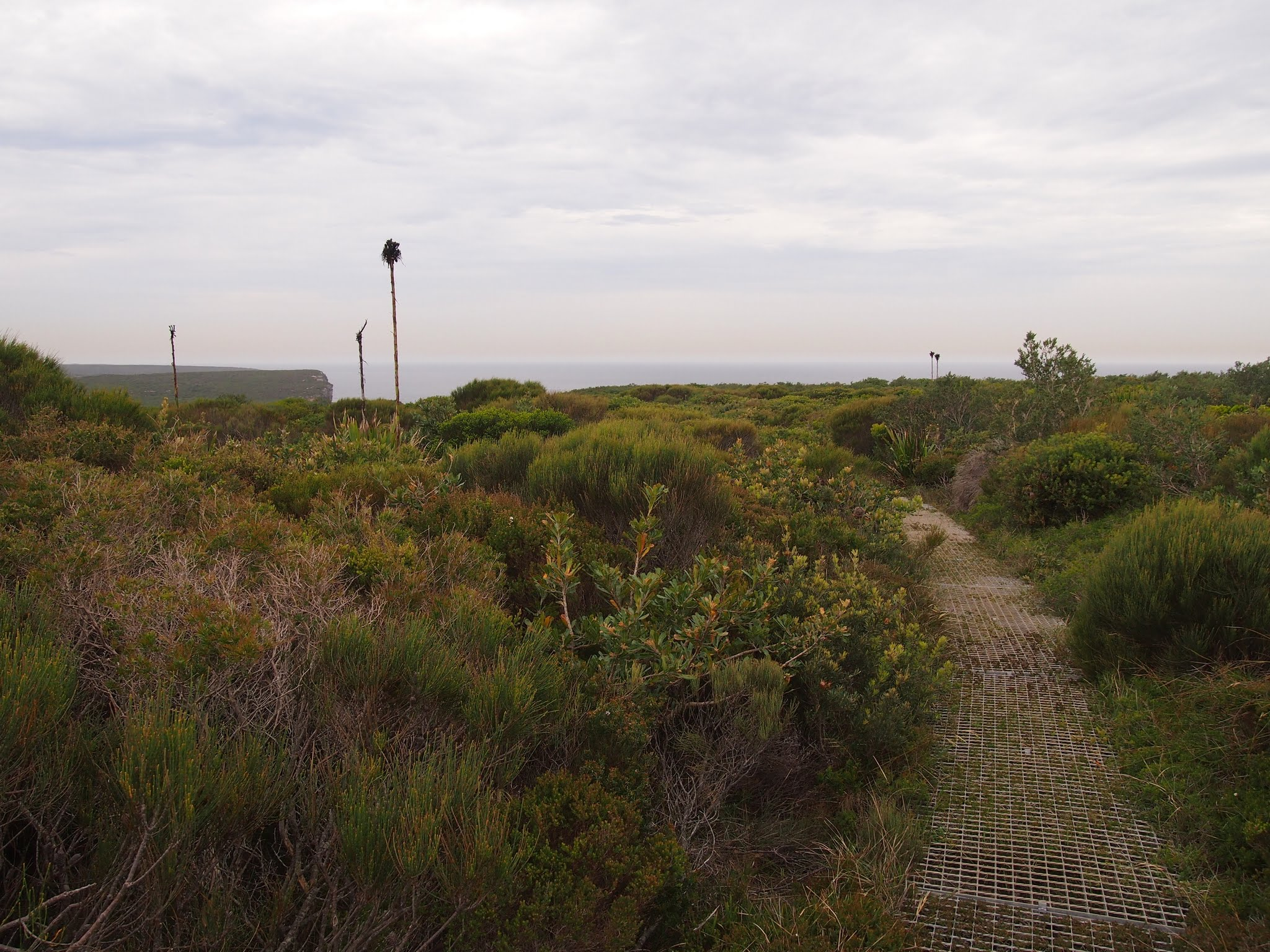
Coast Track (#70)

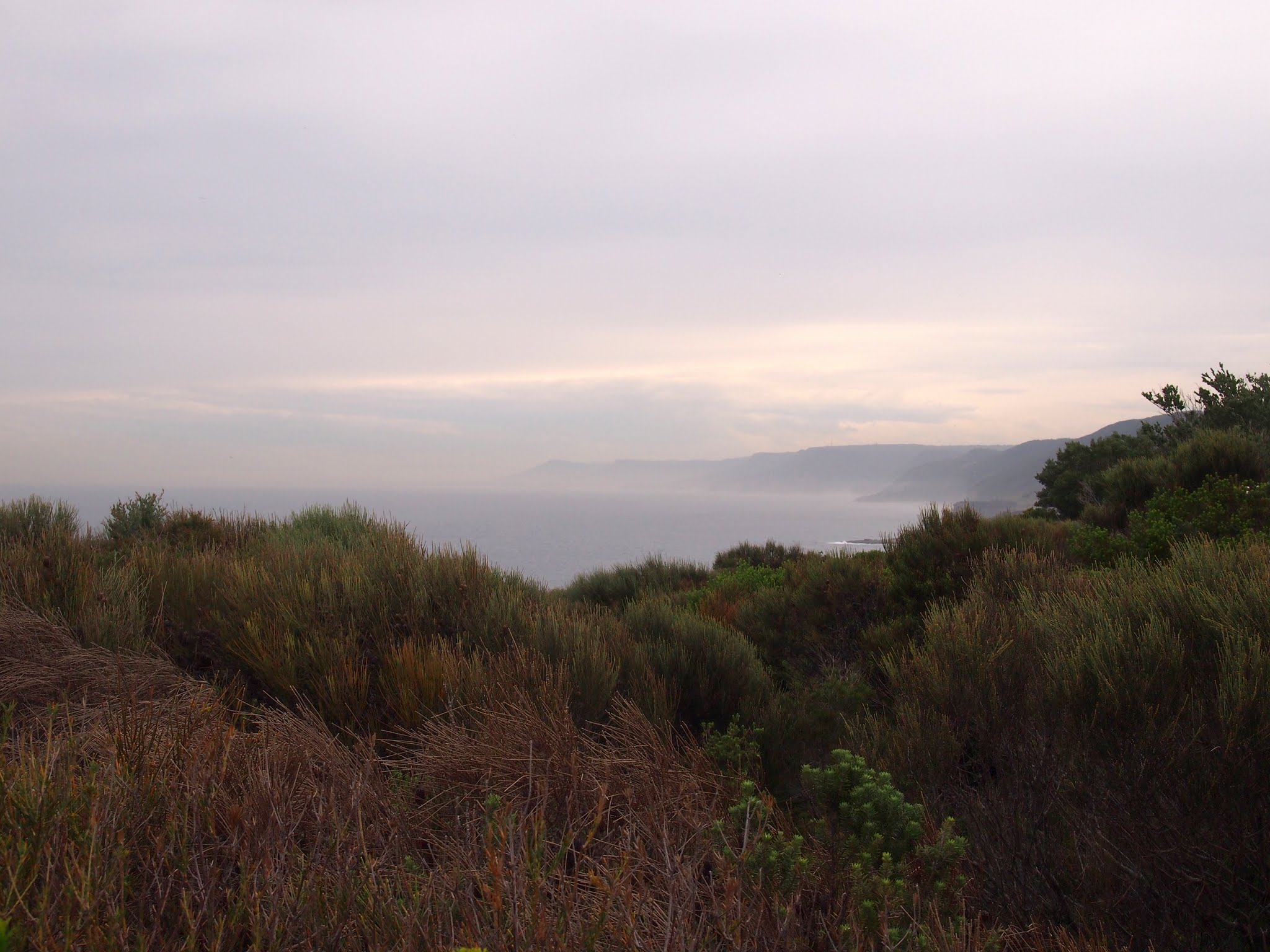
Coast Track (#71)

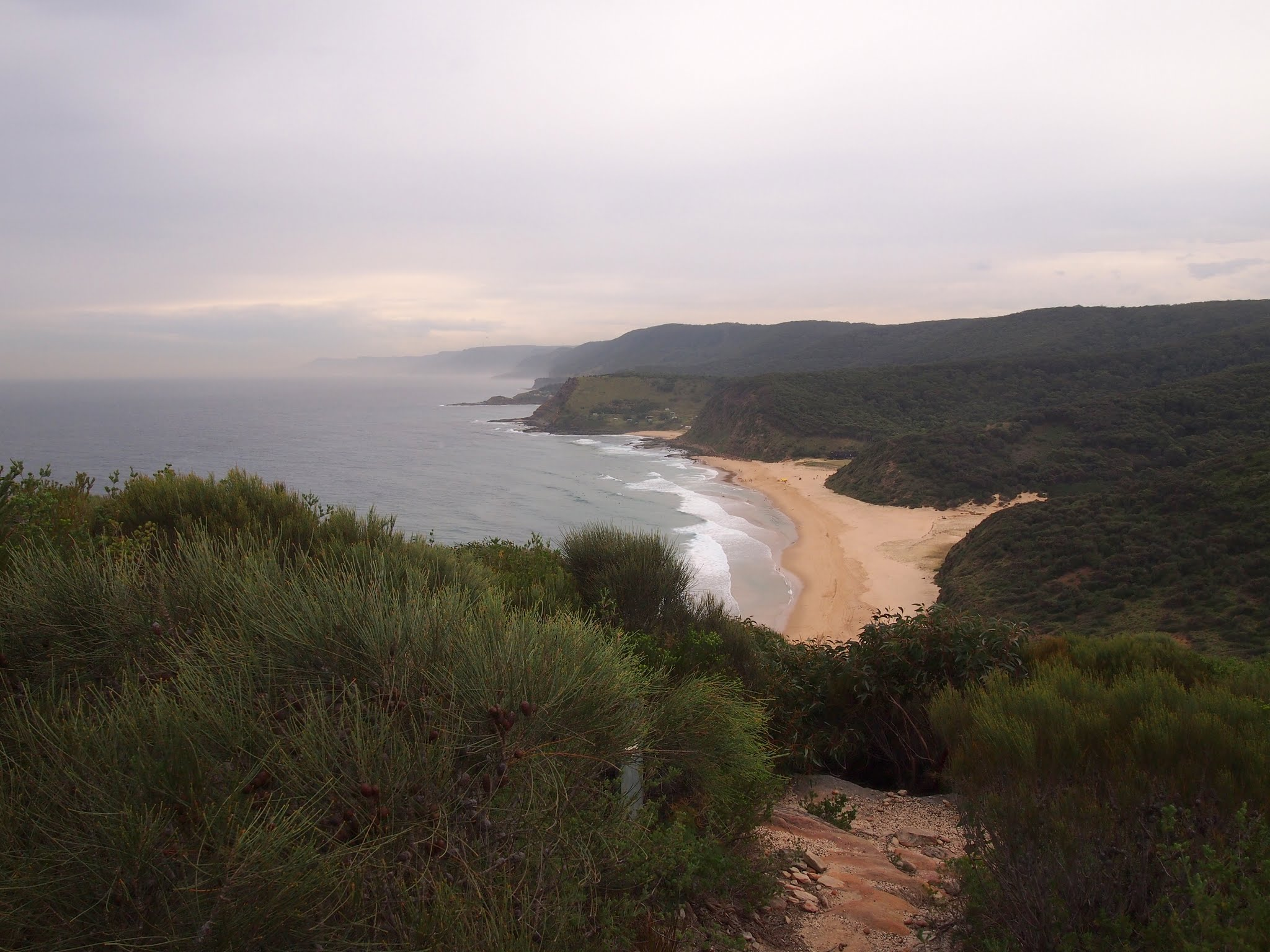
Coast Track (#72)

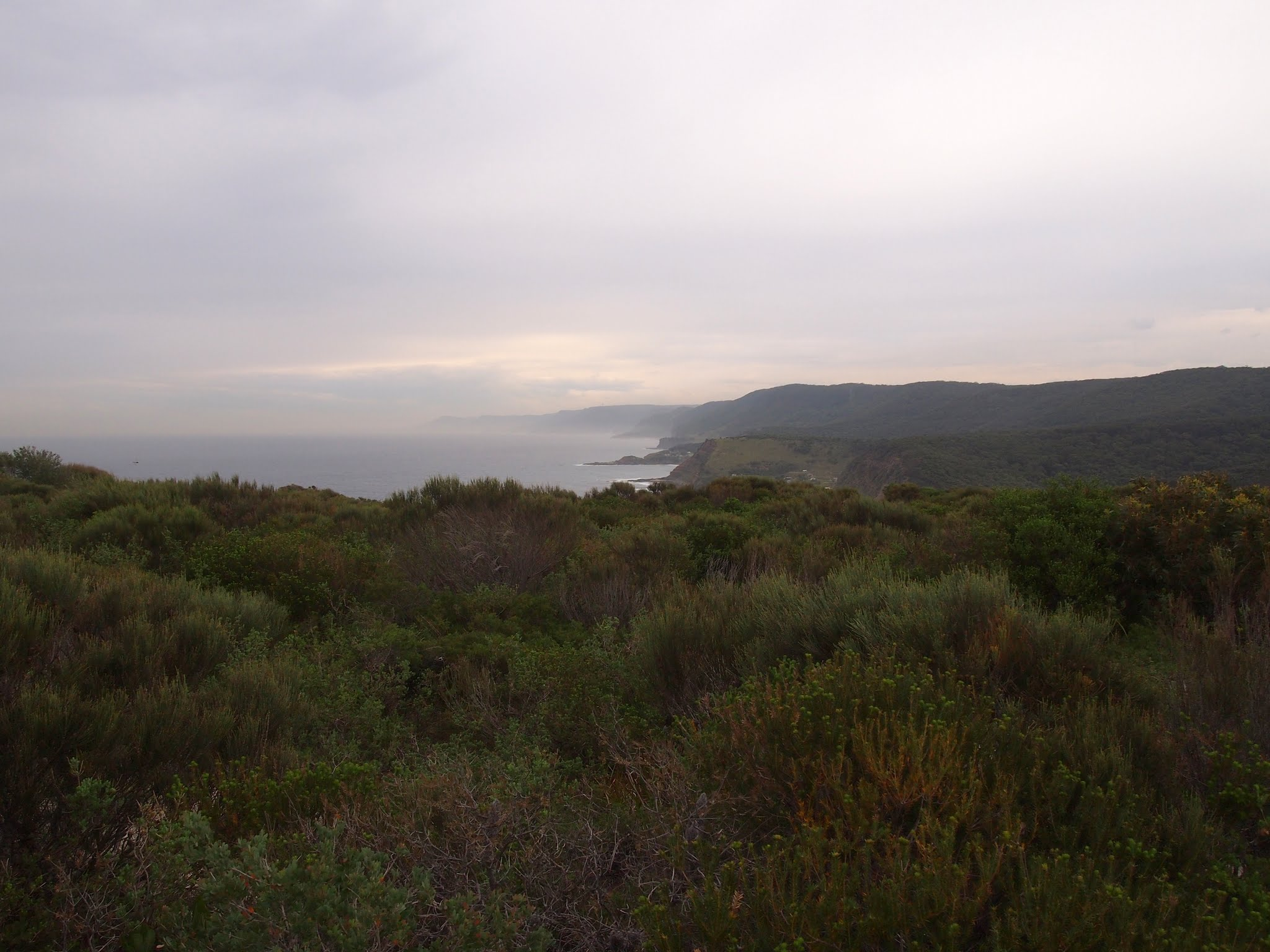
Coast Track (#73)

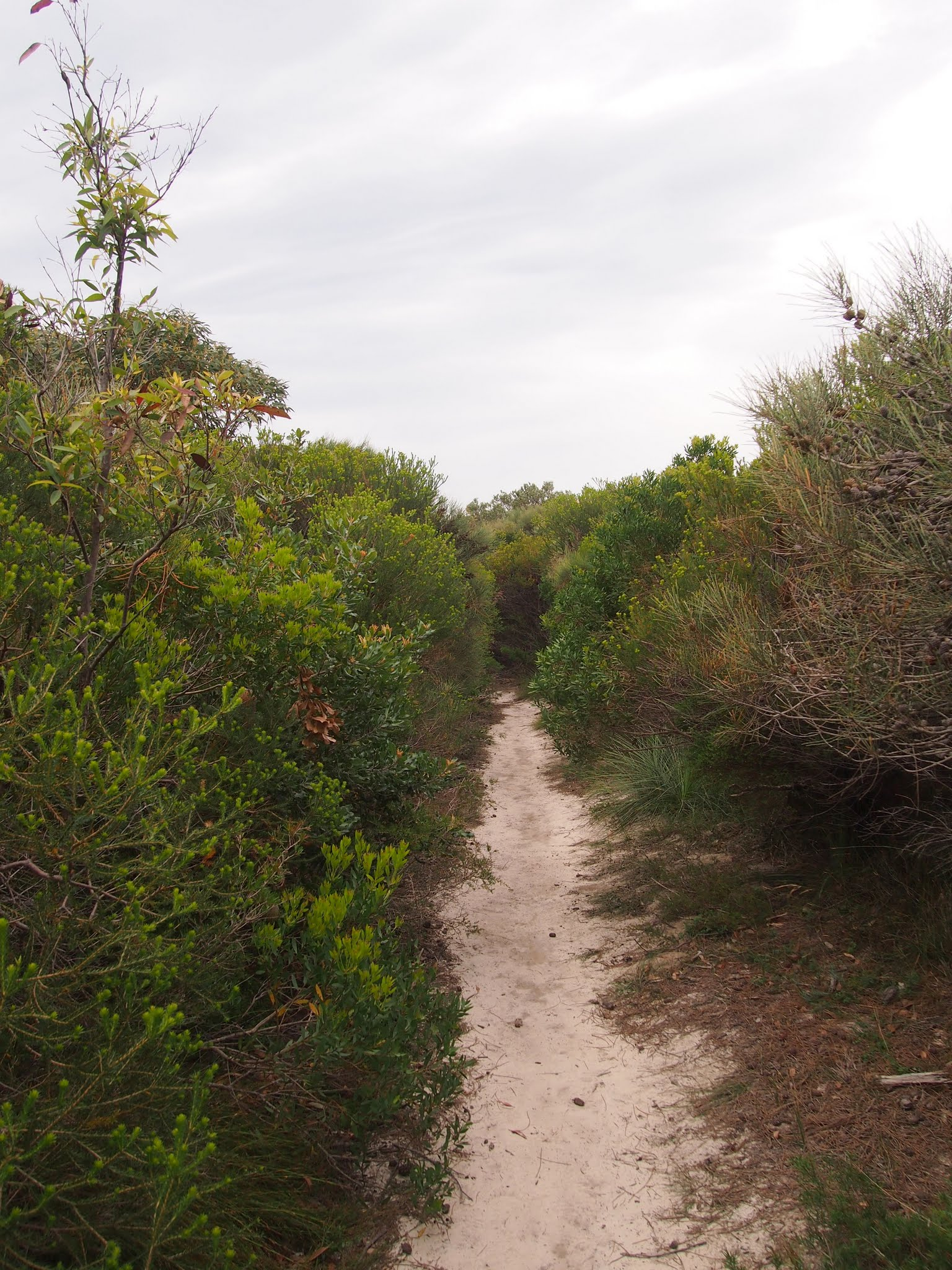
Coast Track (#74)

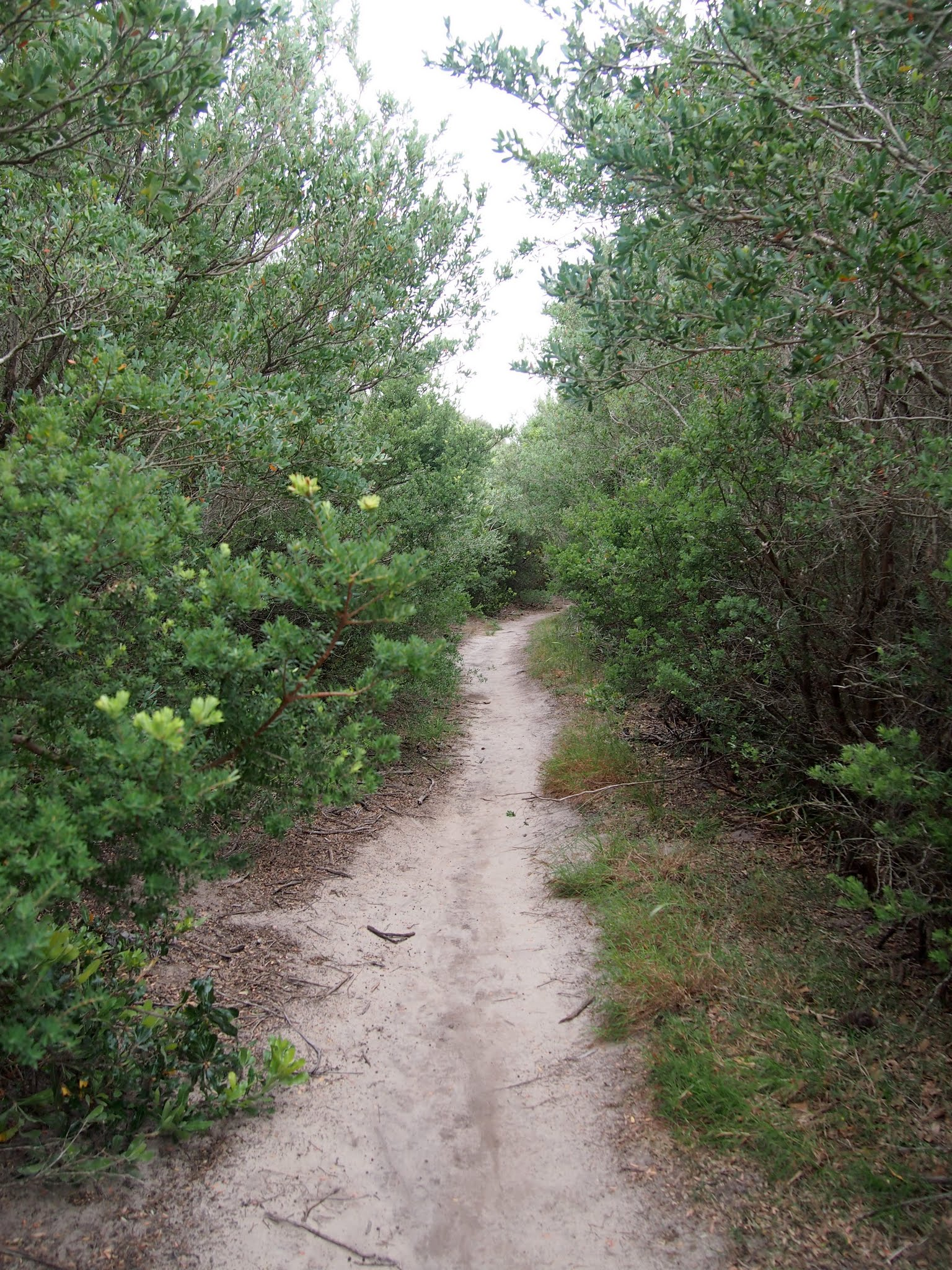
Coast Track (#75)

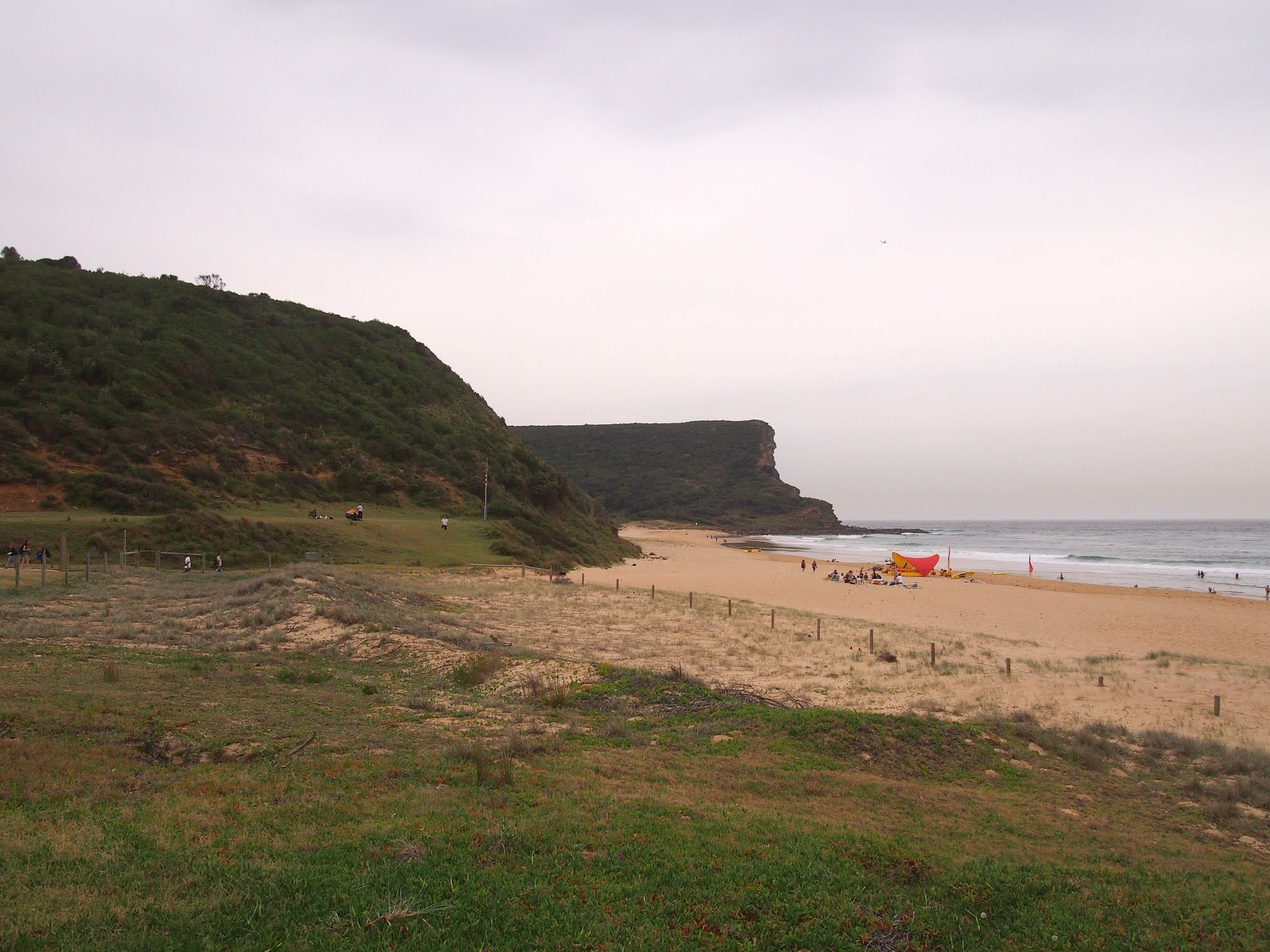
Coast Track (#76)

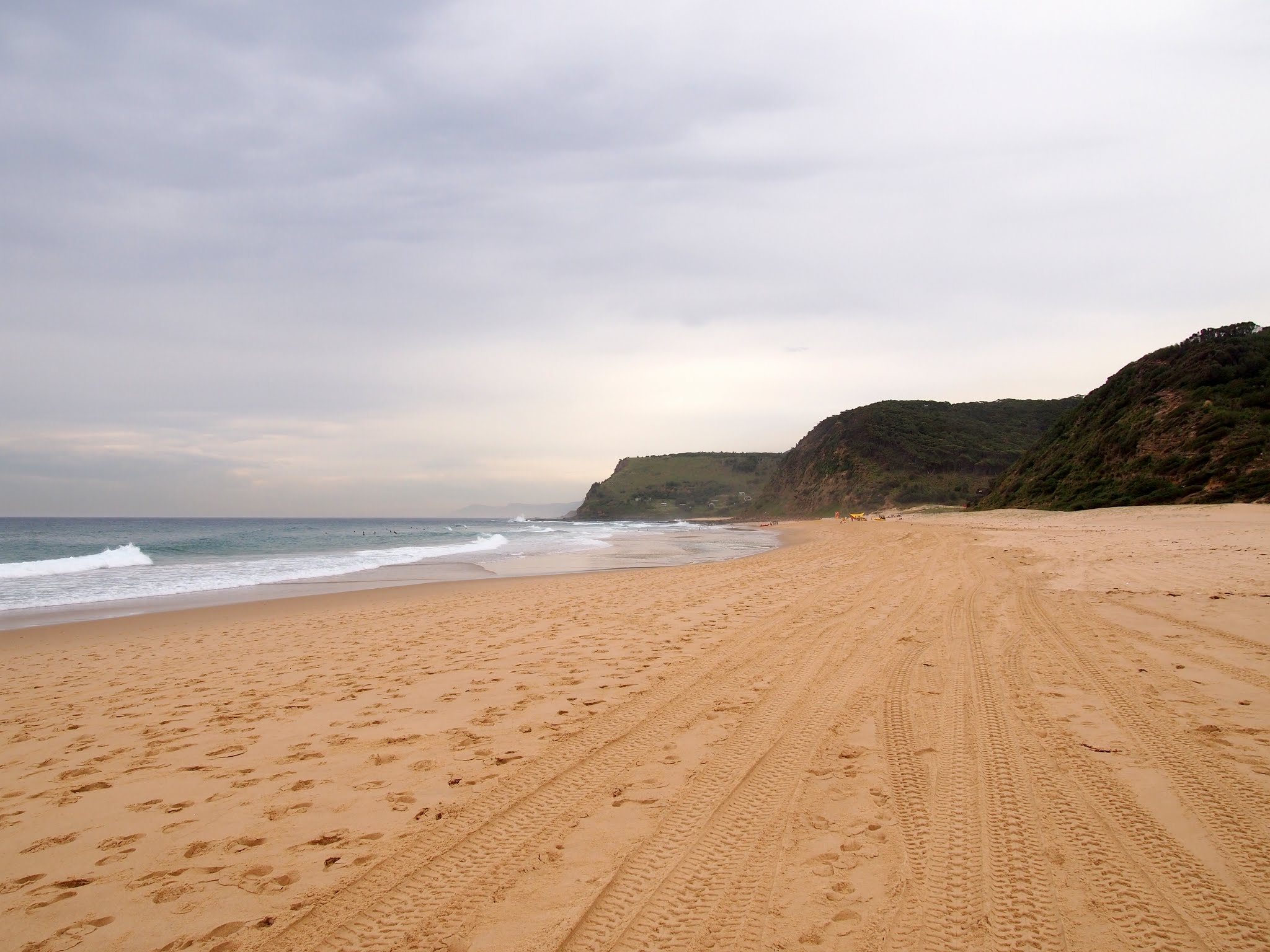
Coast Track (#77)

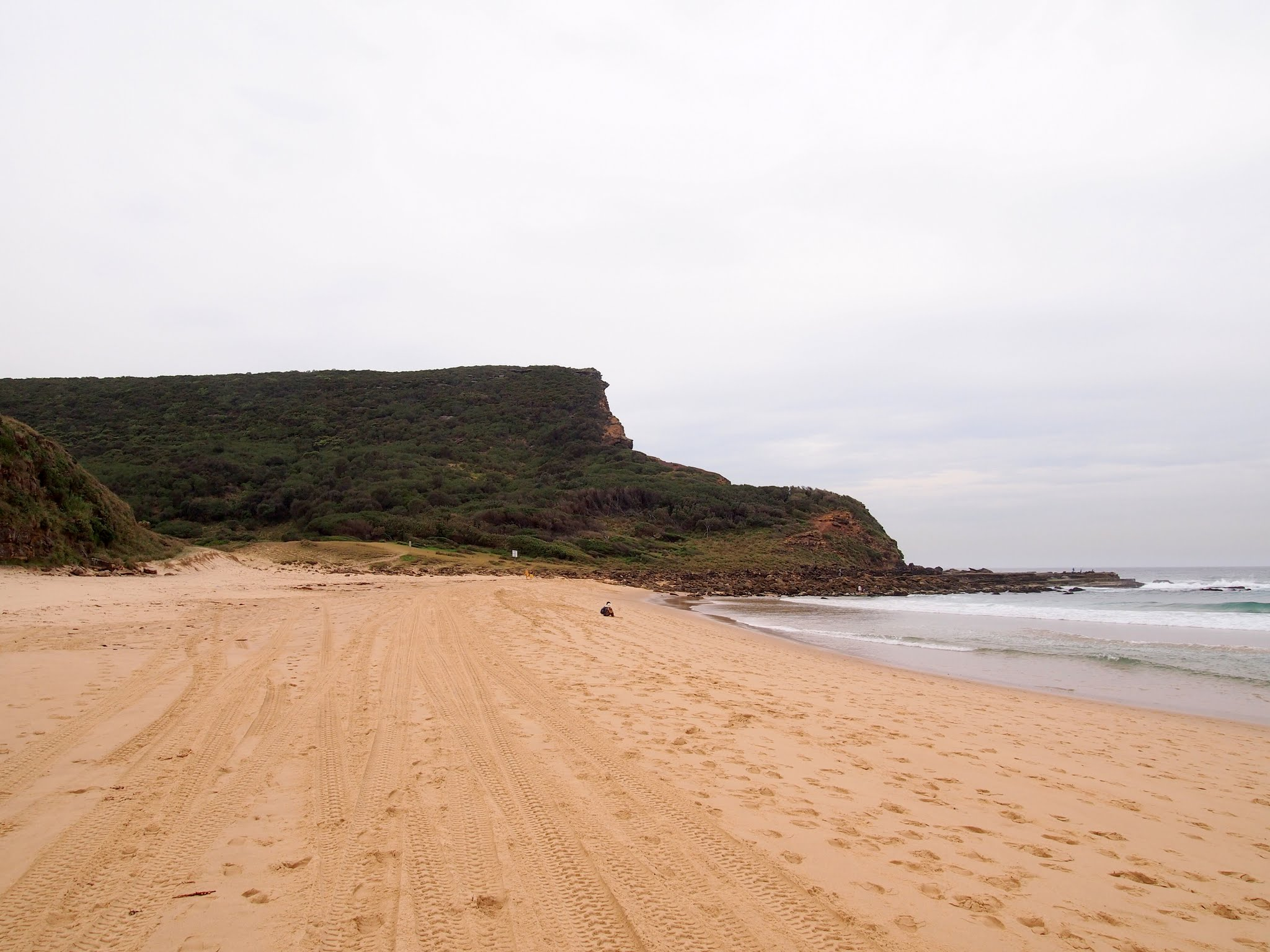
Coast Track (#78)

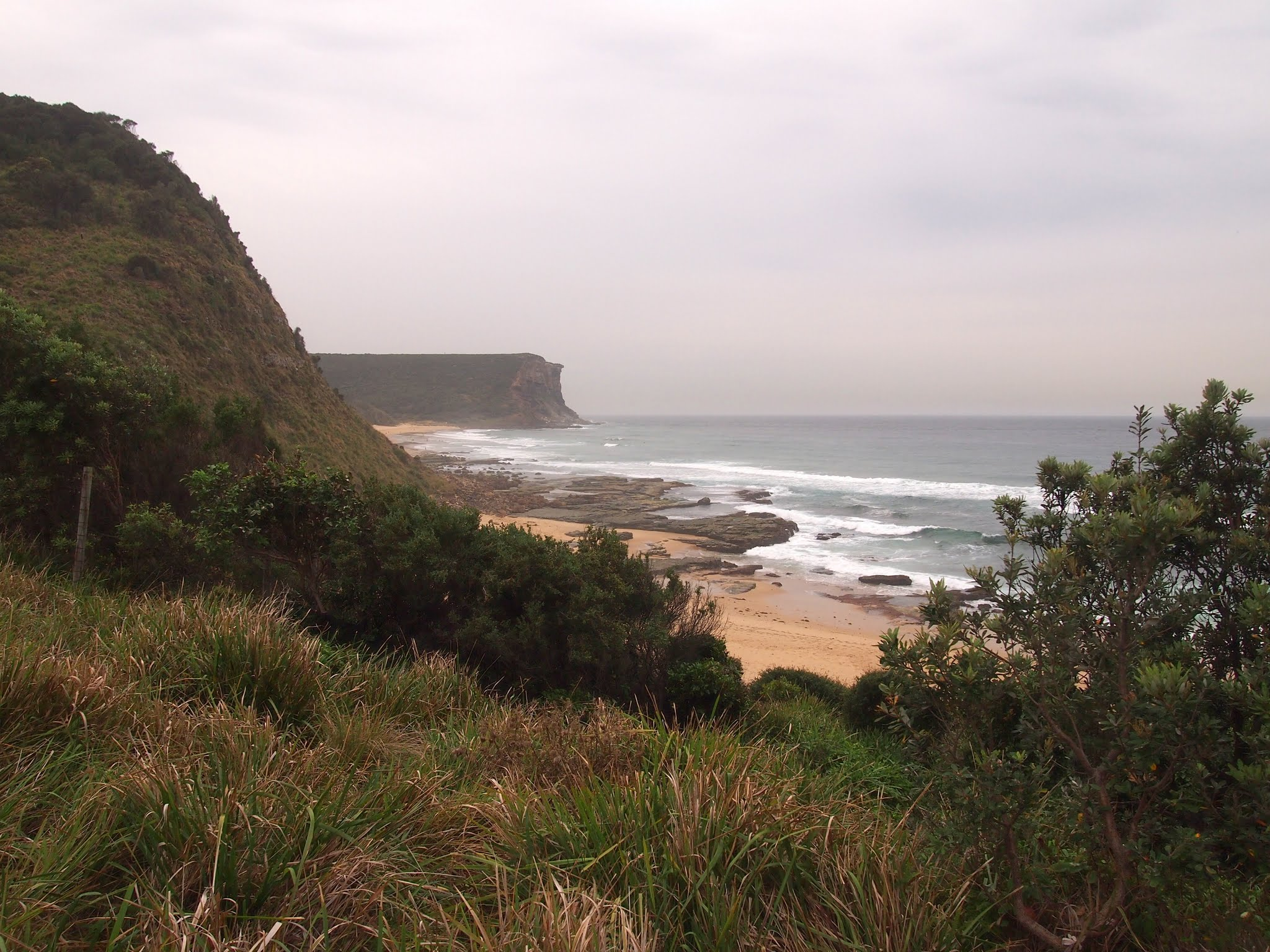
Coast Track (#79)

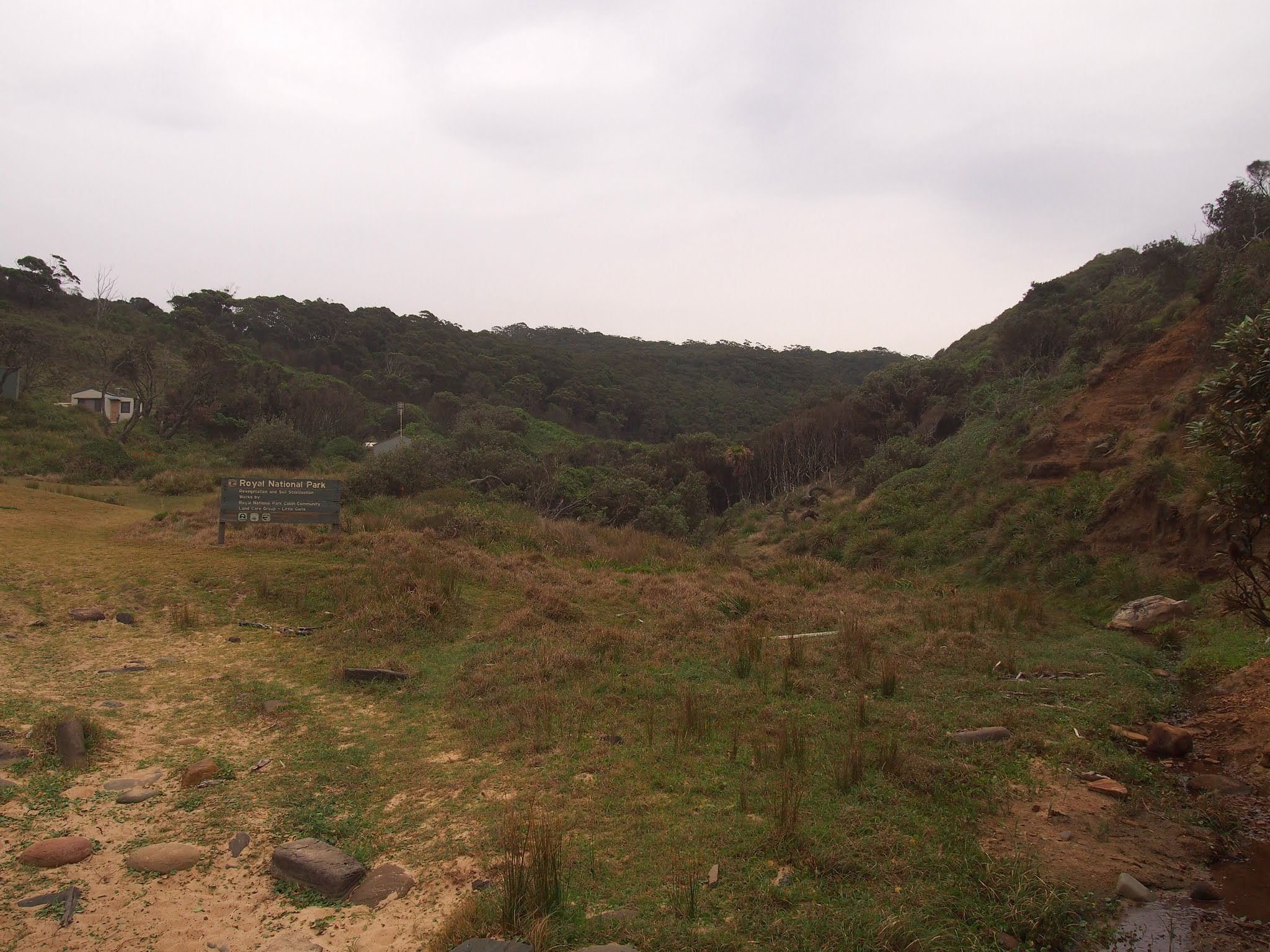
Coast Track (#80)

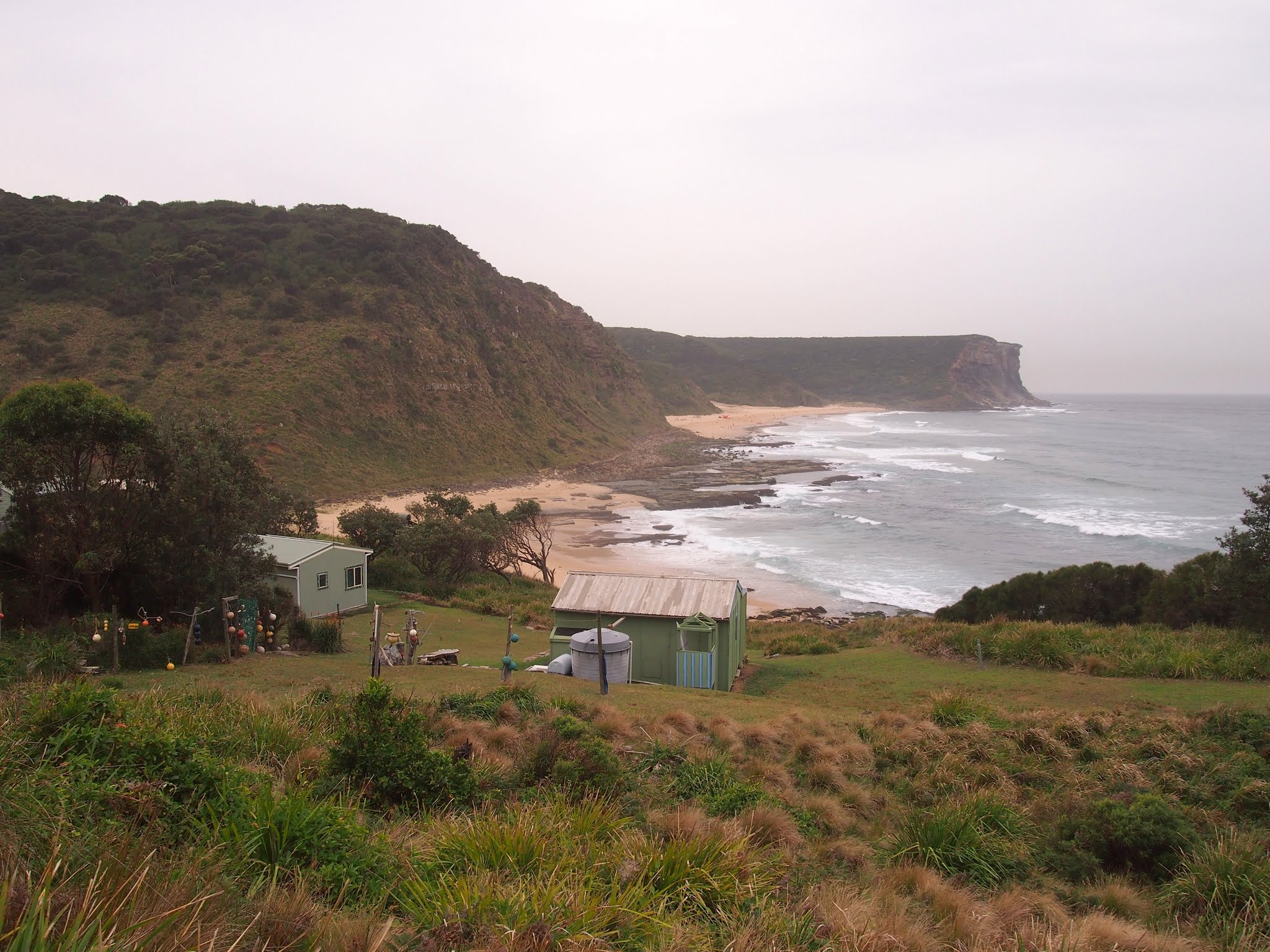
Coast Track (#81)

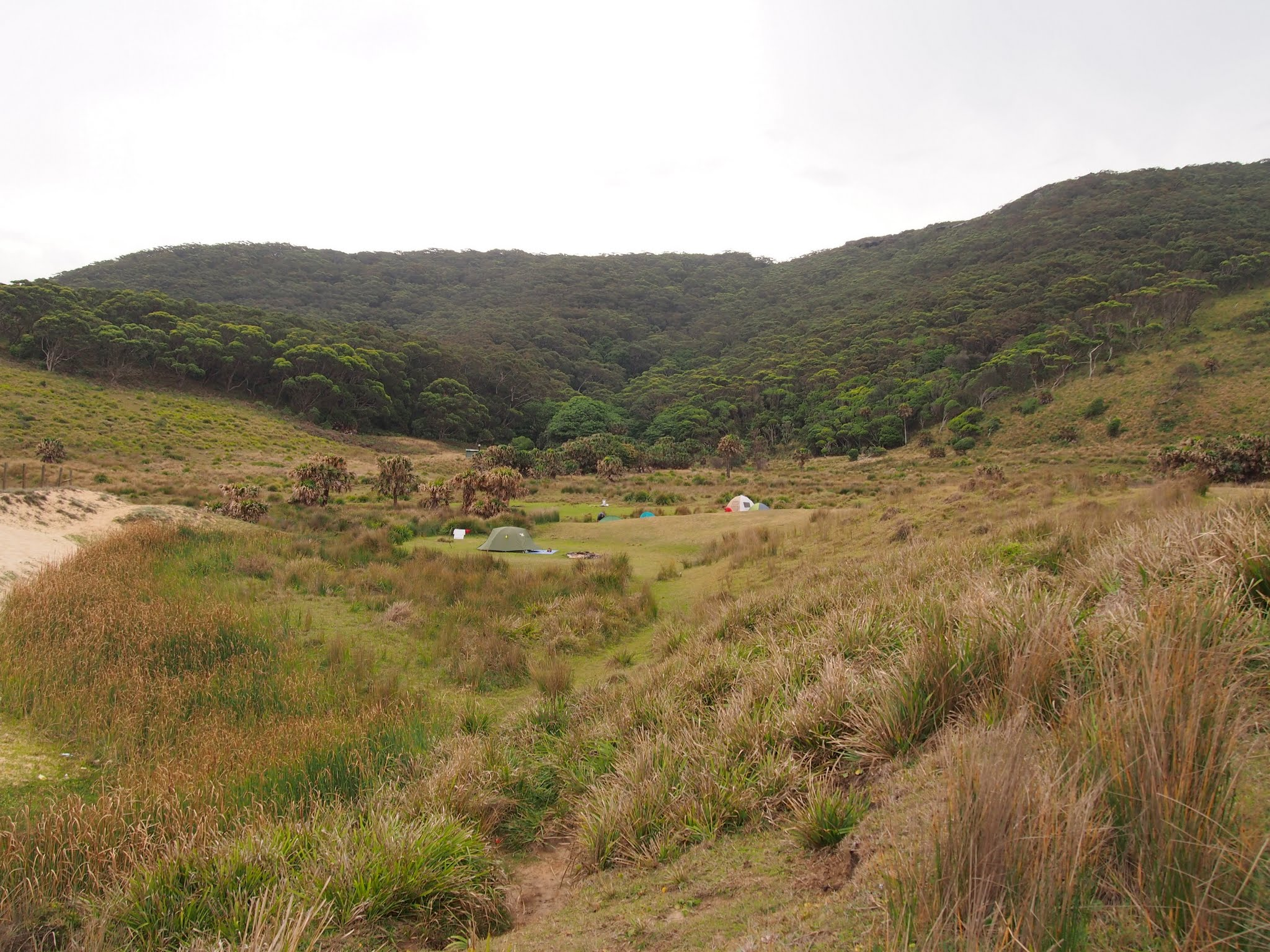
Coast Track (#82)

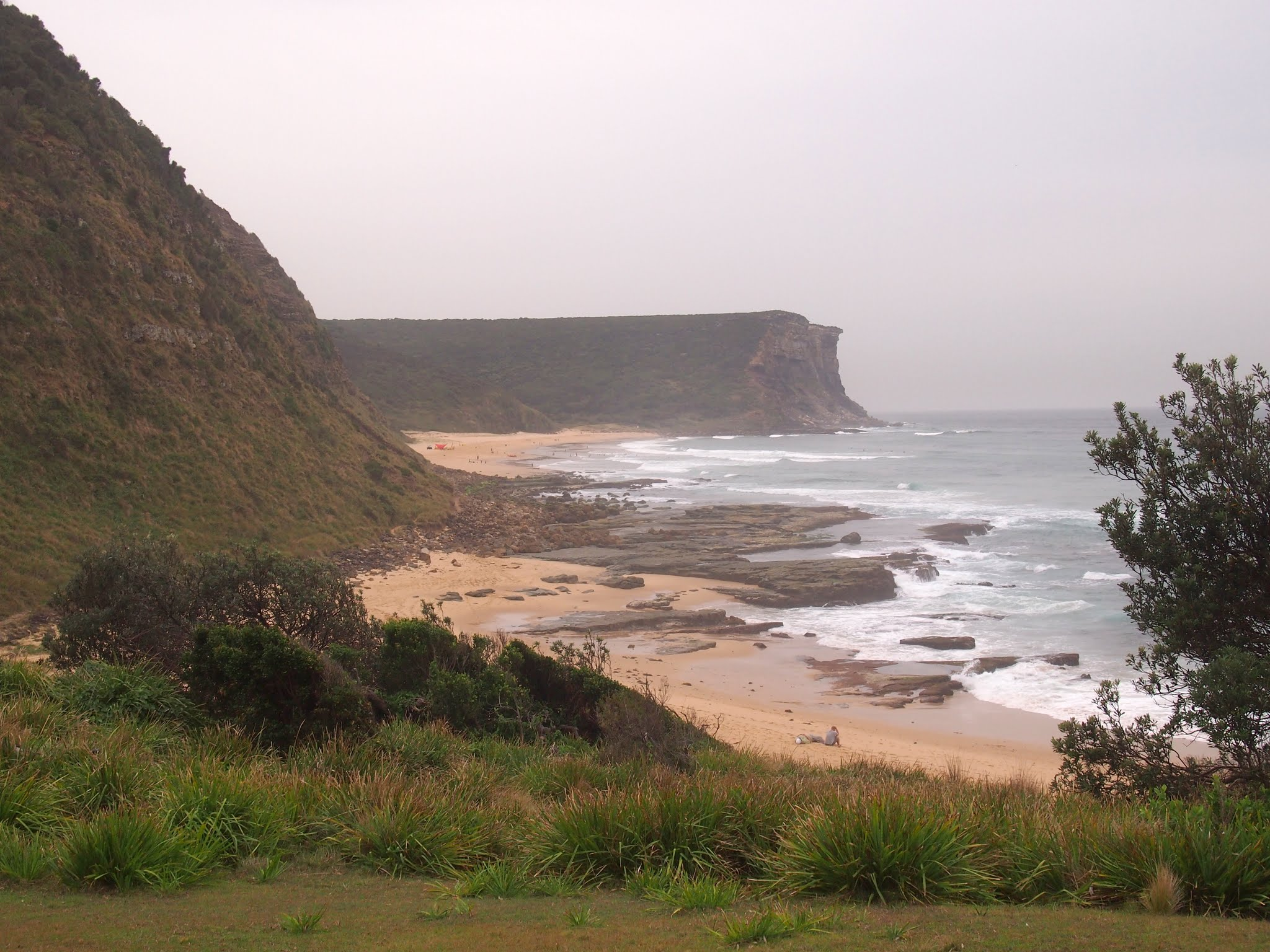
Coast Track (#83)

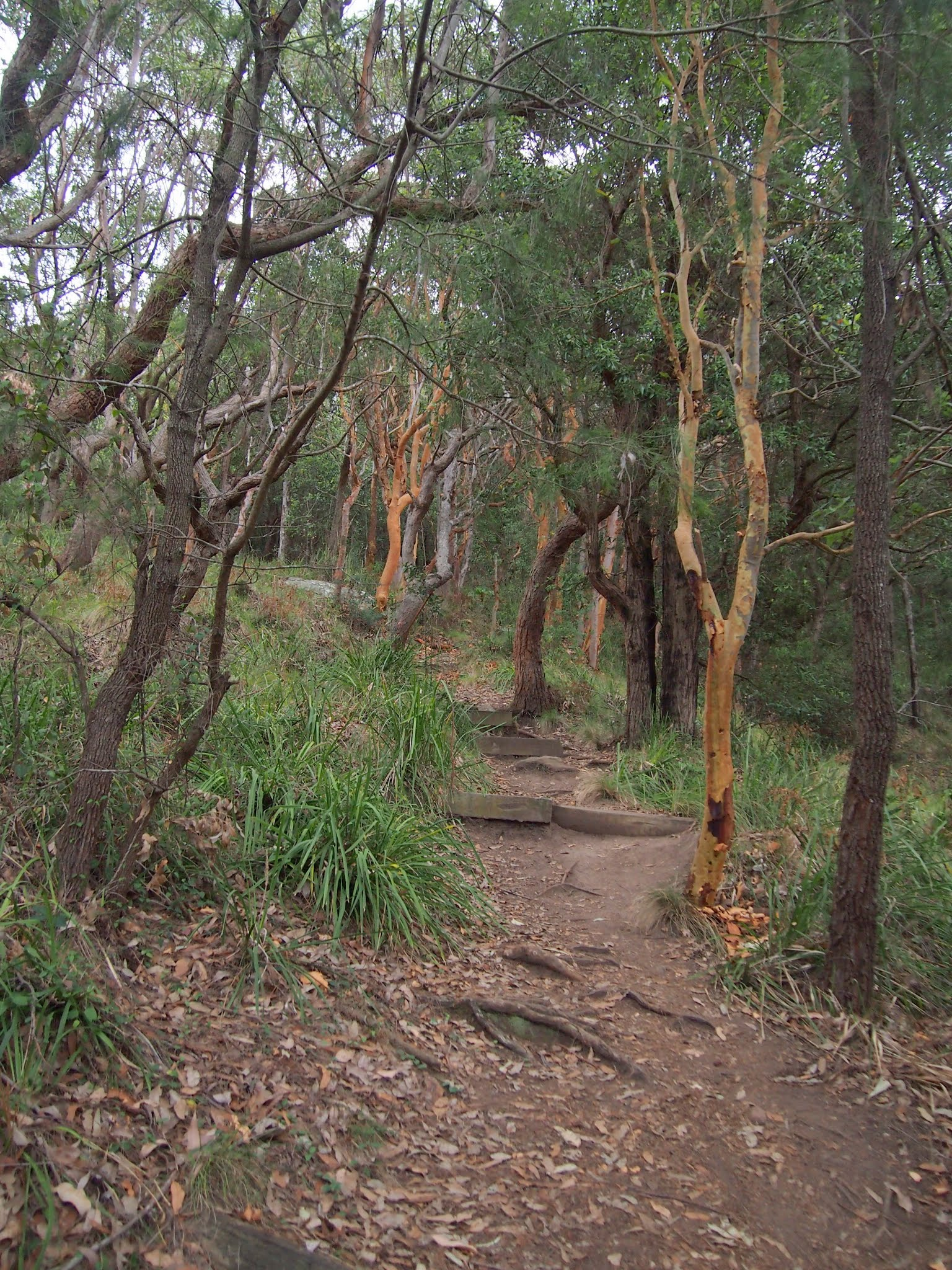
Garawarra Ridge (#1)

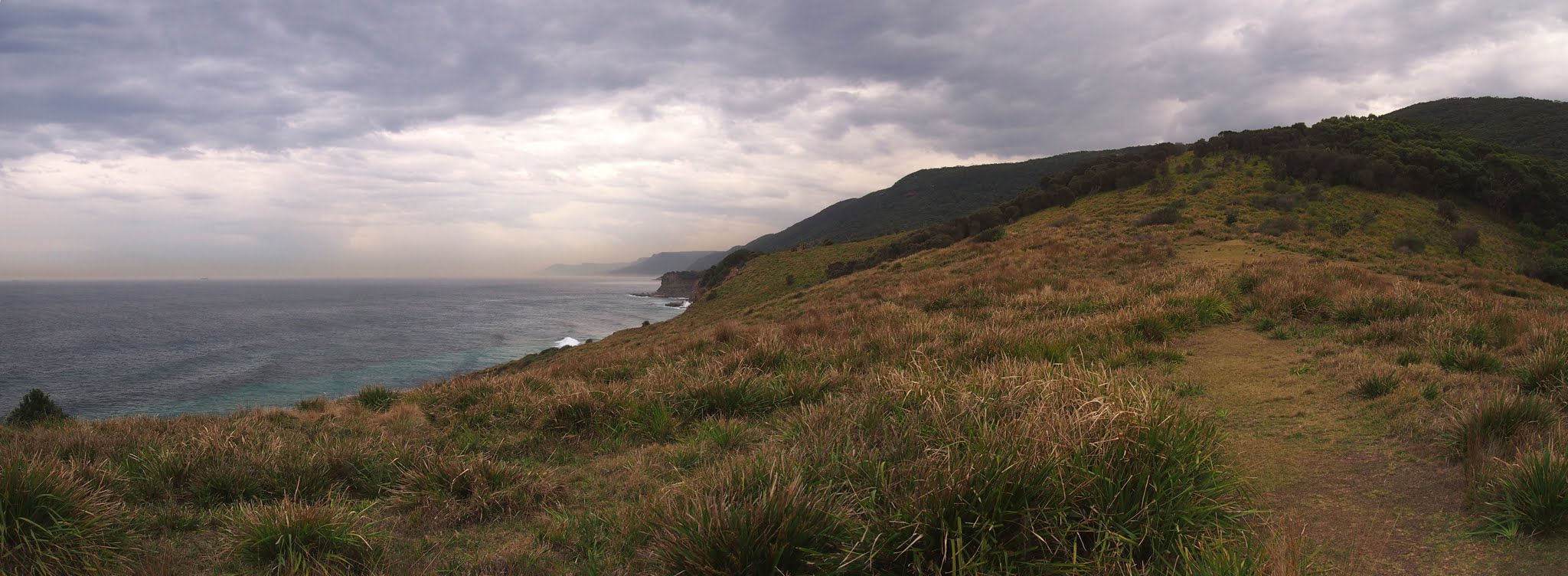
Coast Track (#84)

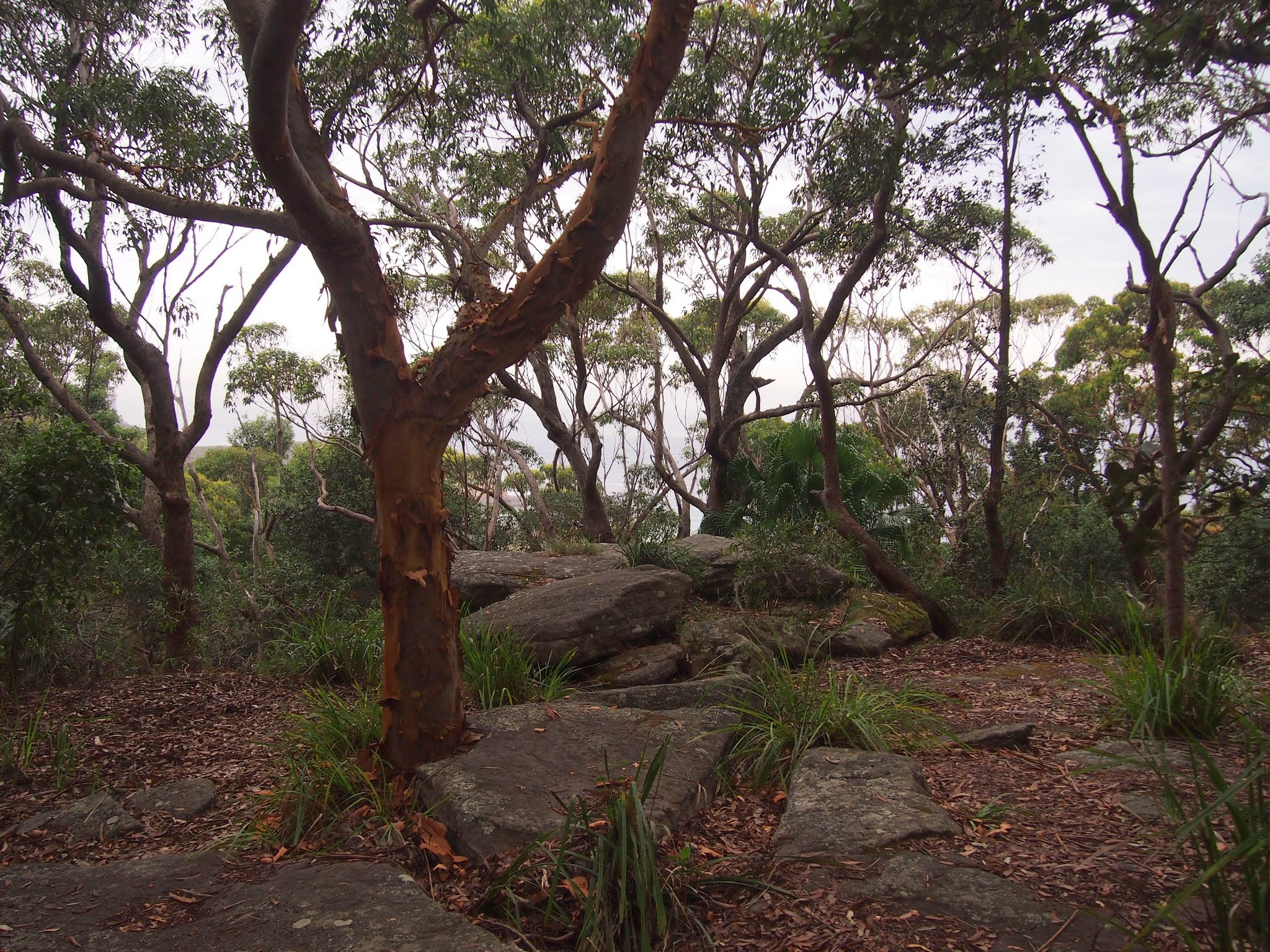
Garawarra Ridge (#2)

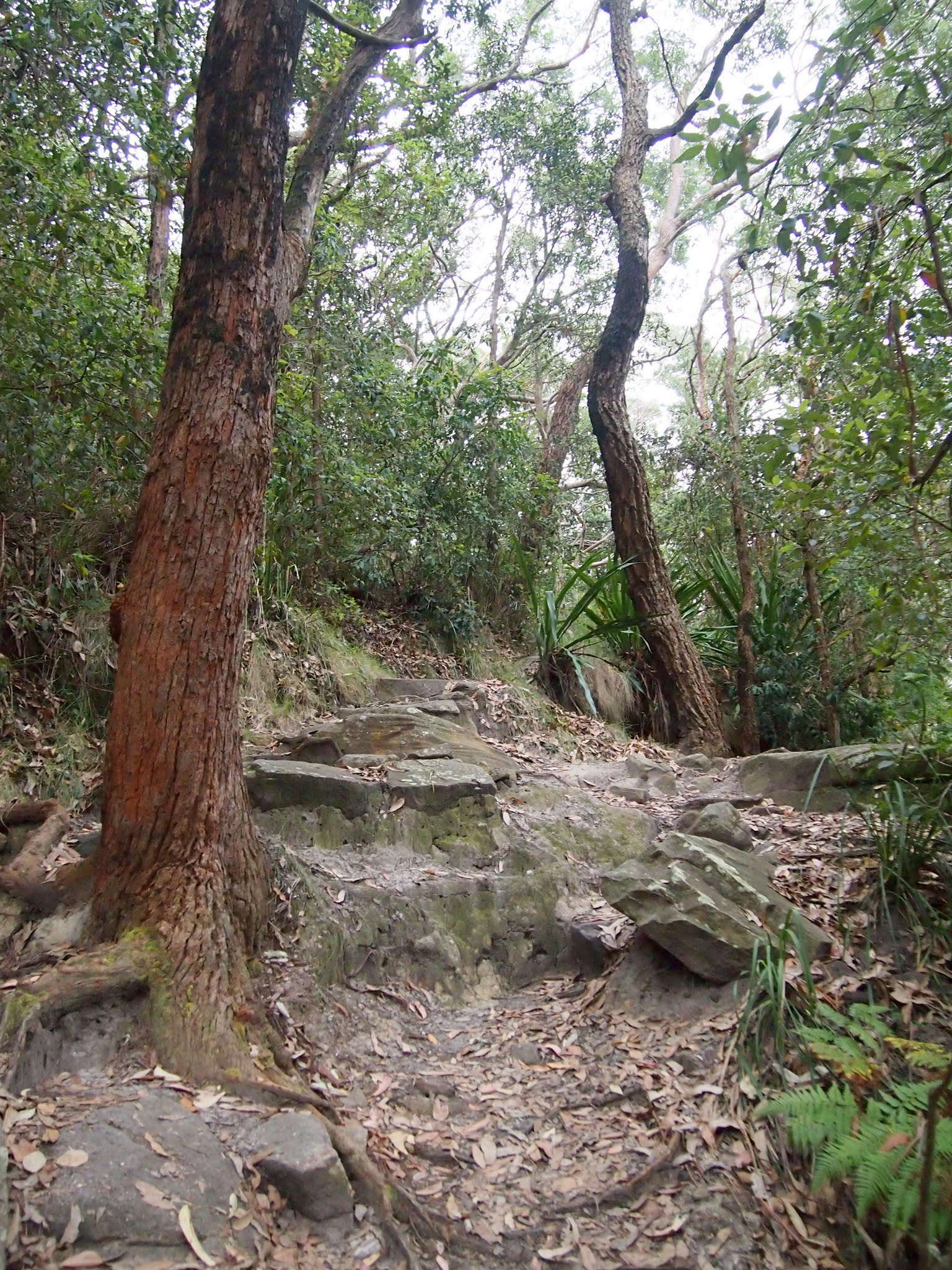
Garawarra Ridge (#3)

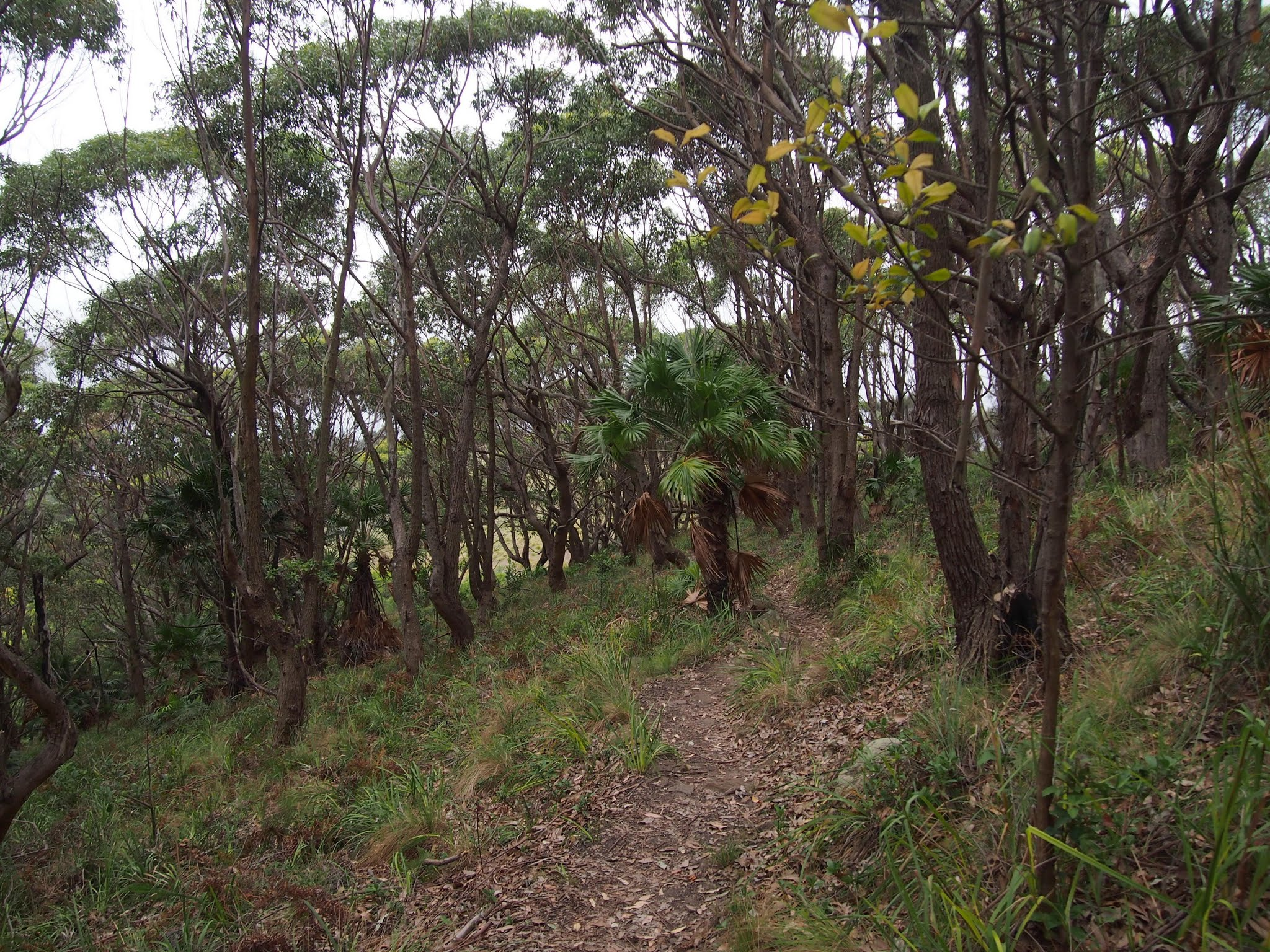
Coast Track (#85)

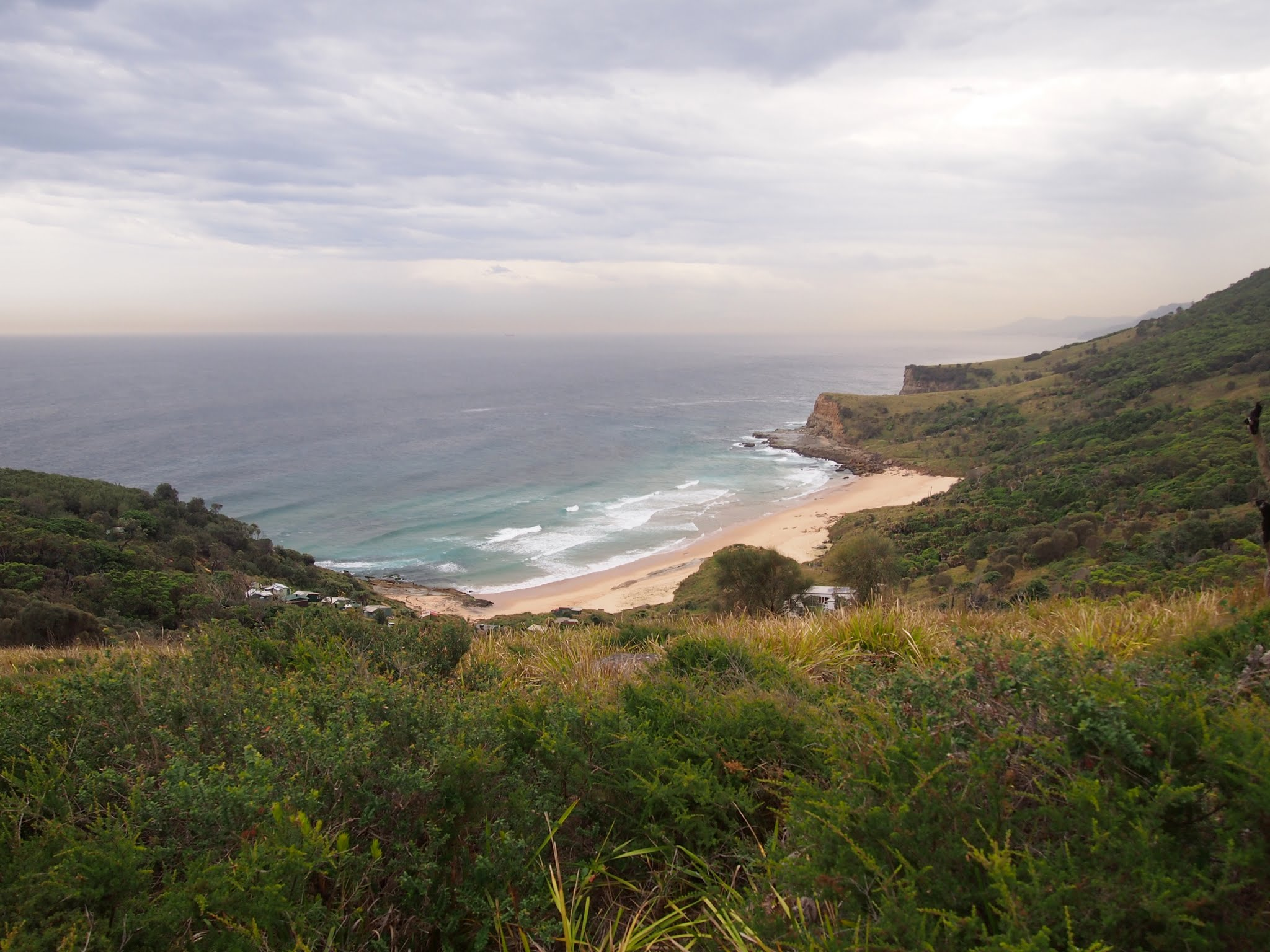
Coast Track (#86)

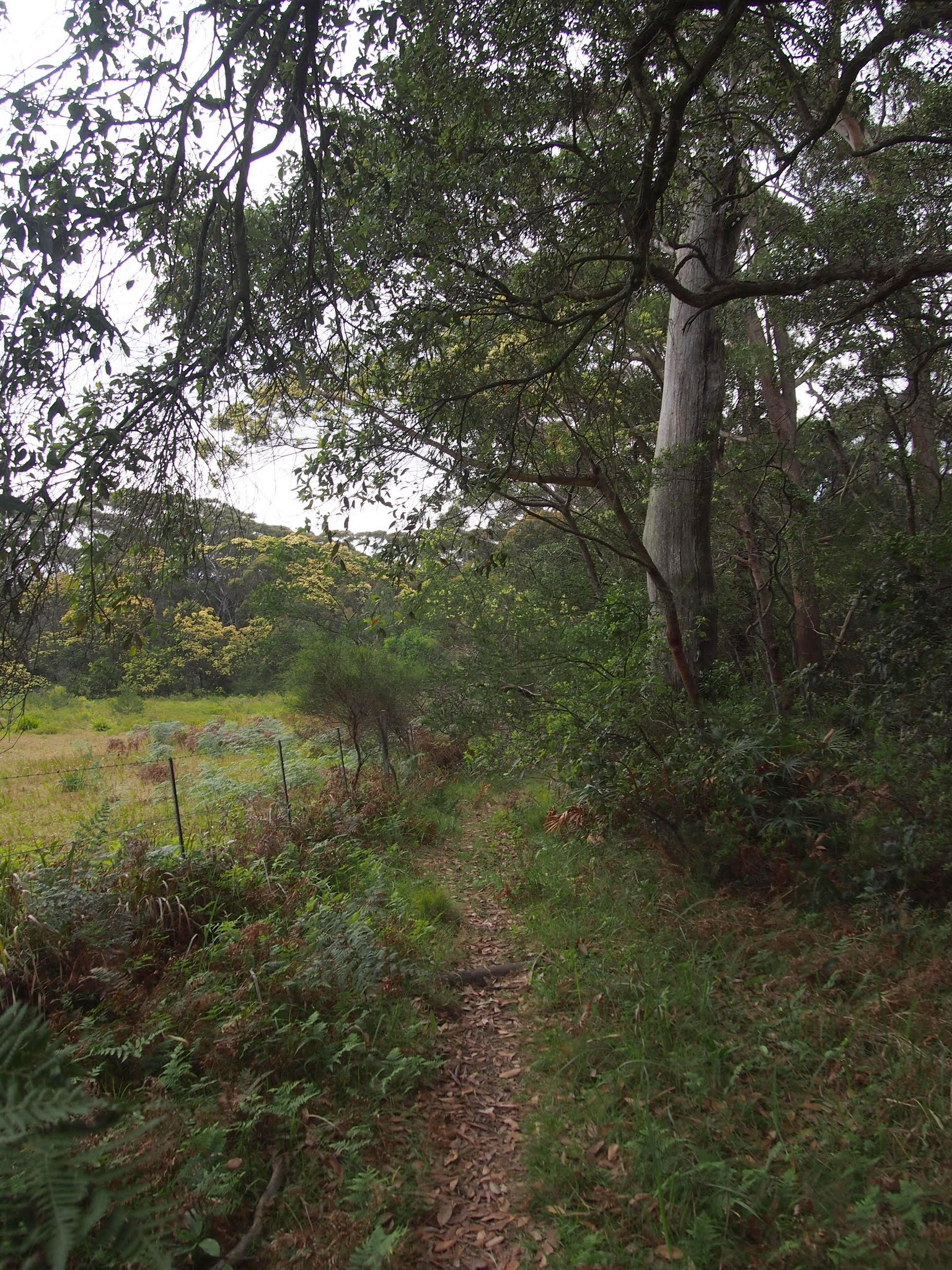
Burgh Track (#1)

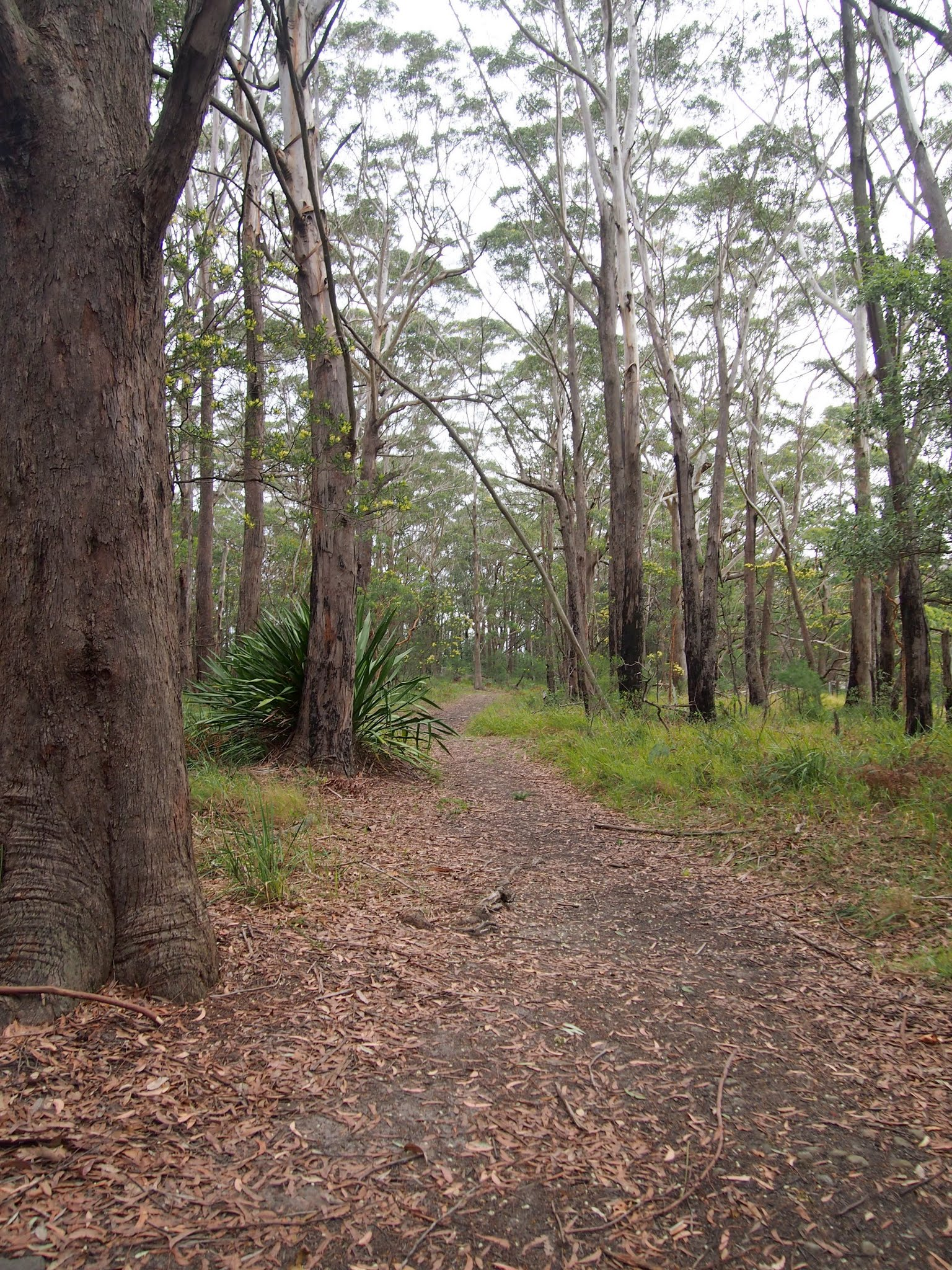
Garawarra Ridge (#4)

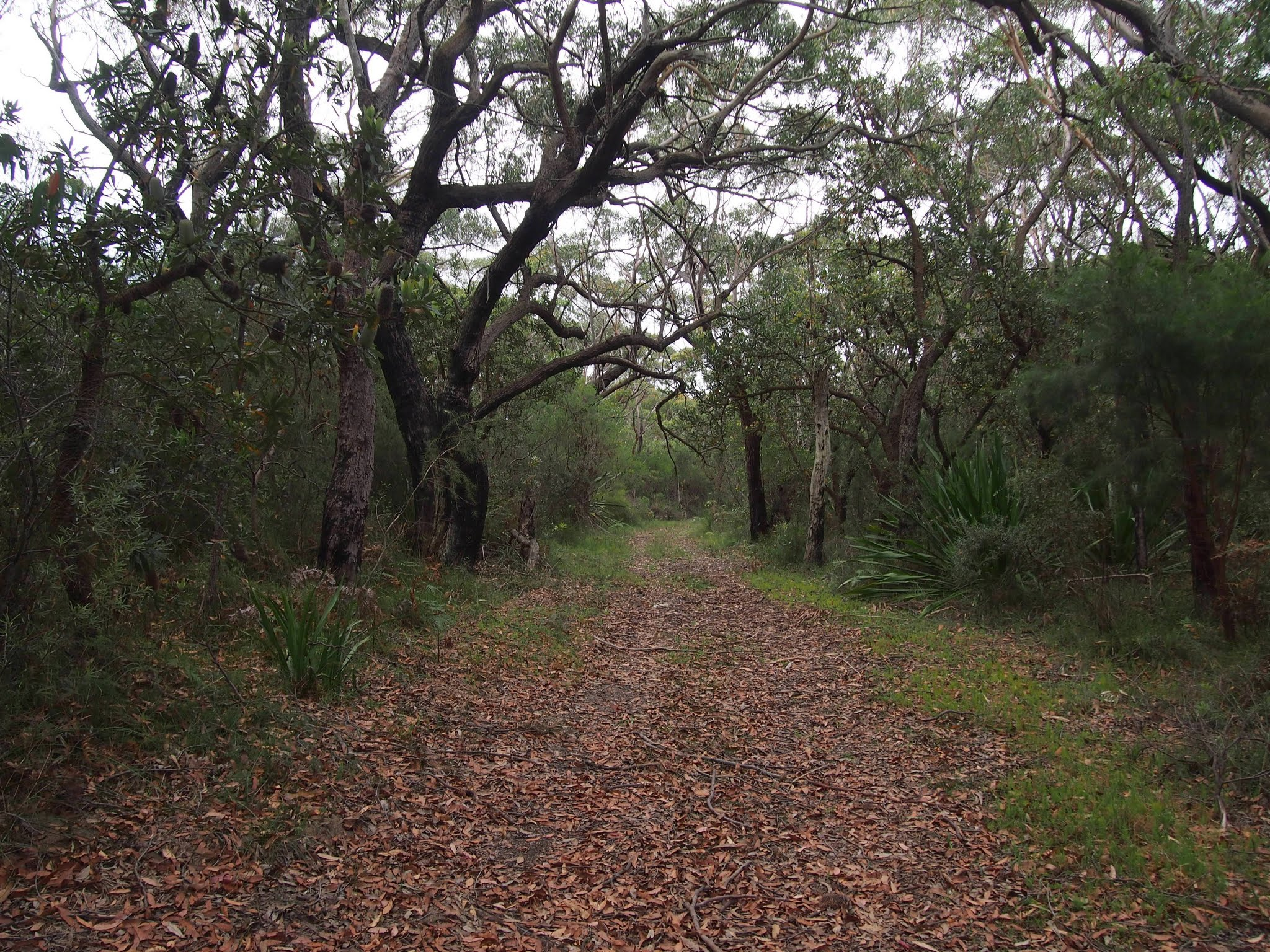
Burgh Track (#2)

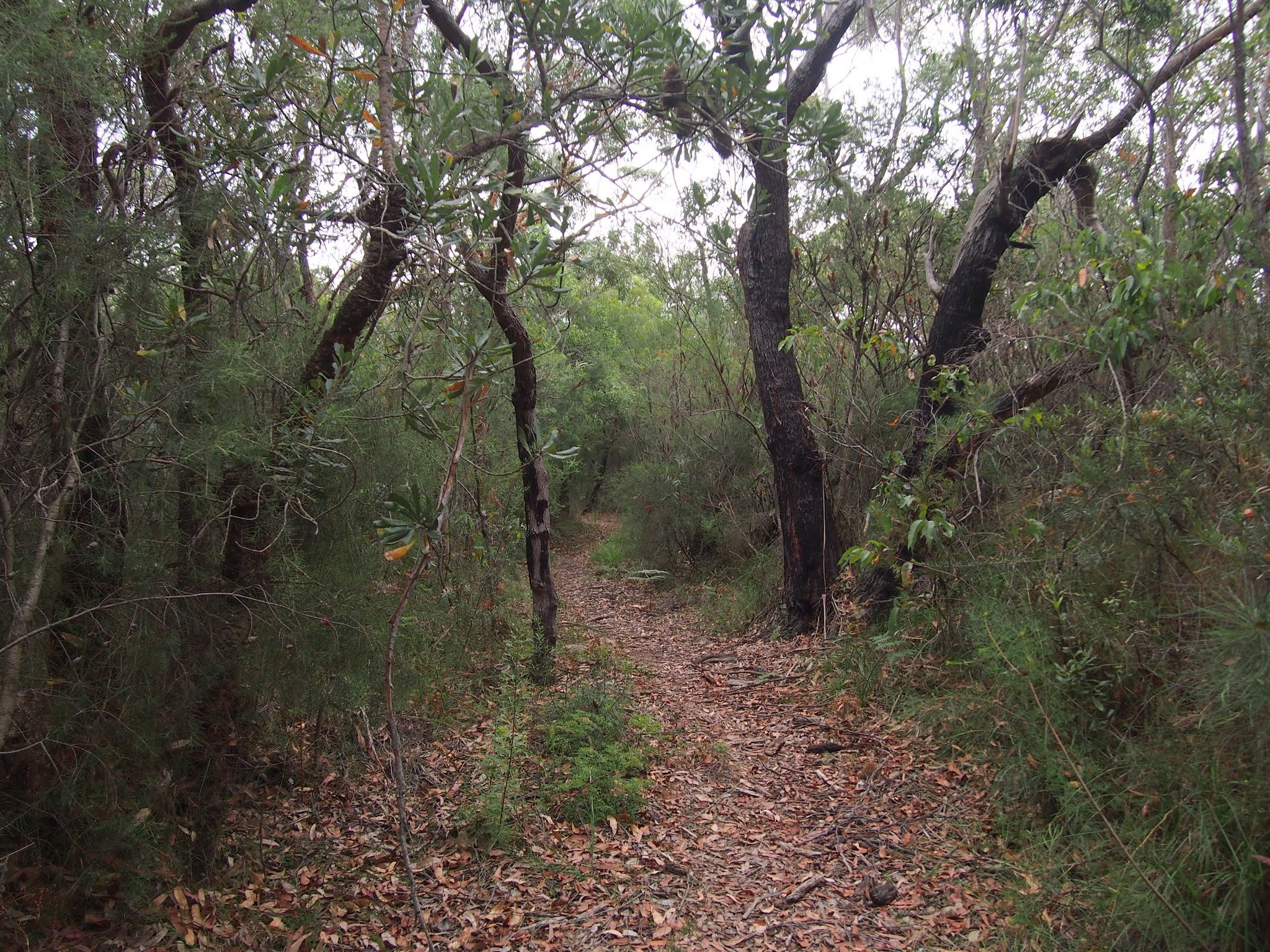
Burgh Track (#3)

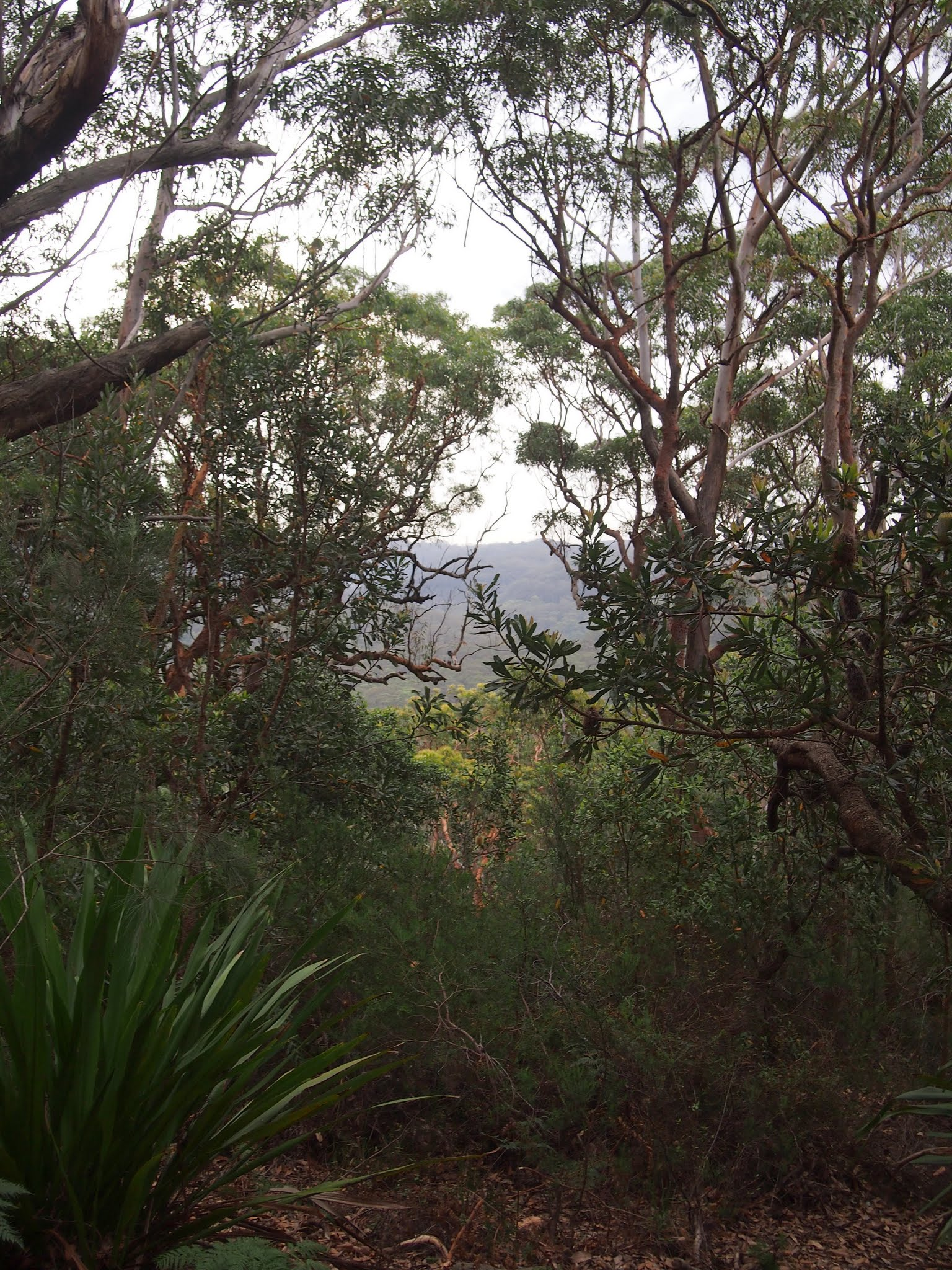
Burgh Track (#4)

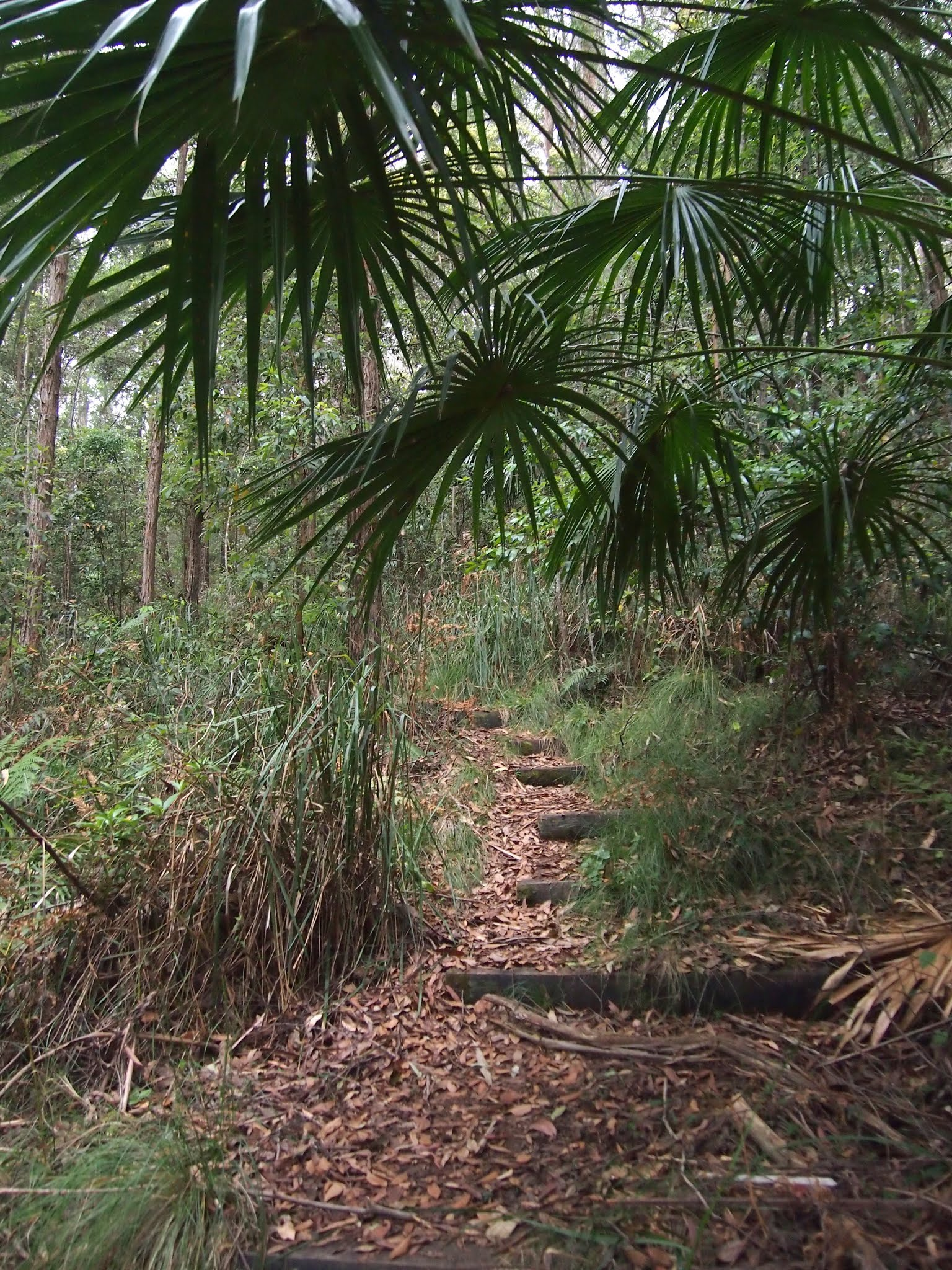
Burgh Track (#5)

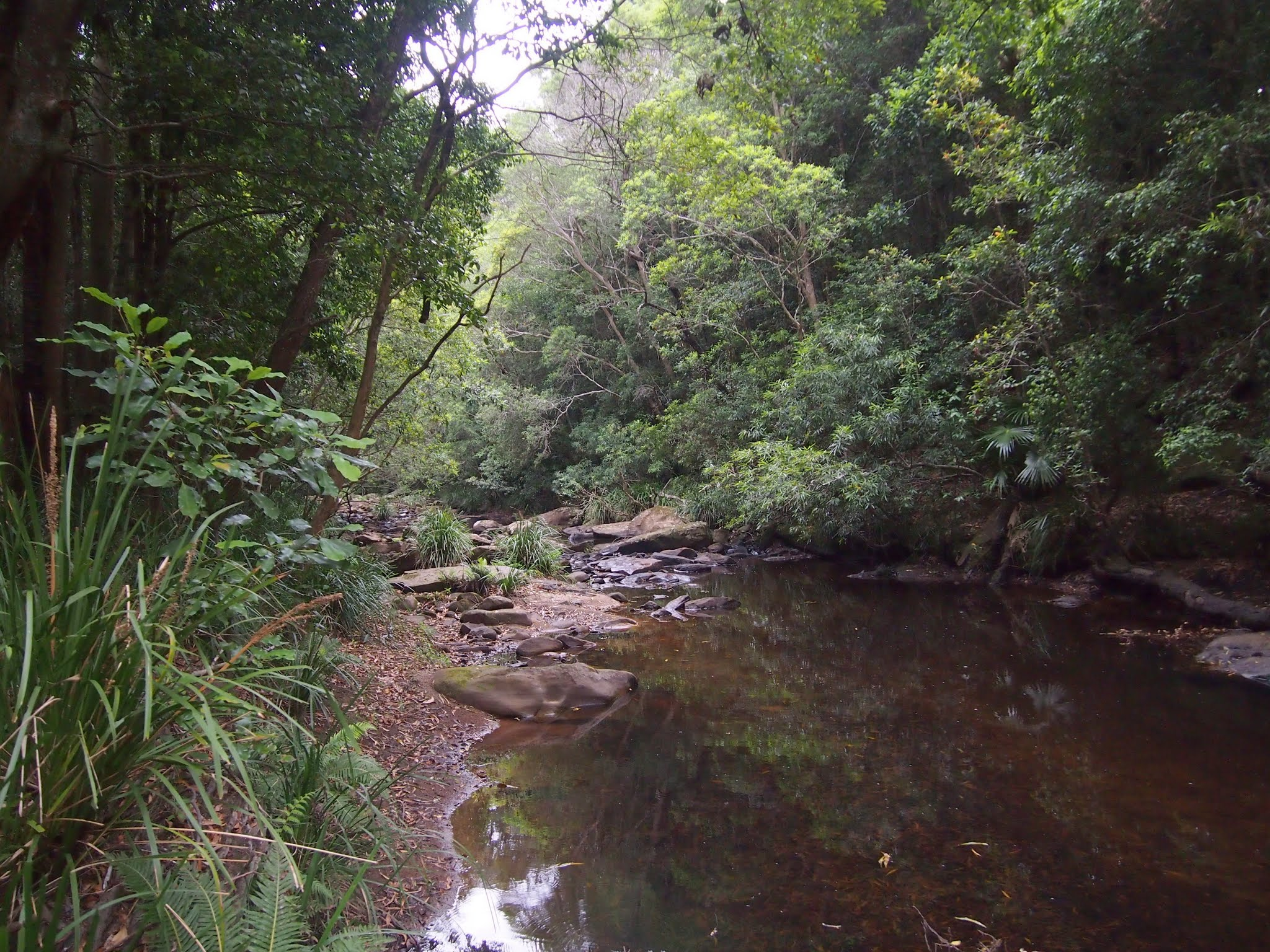
Burgh Track (#6)

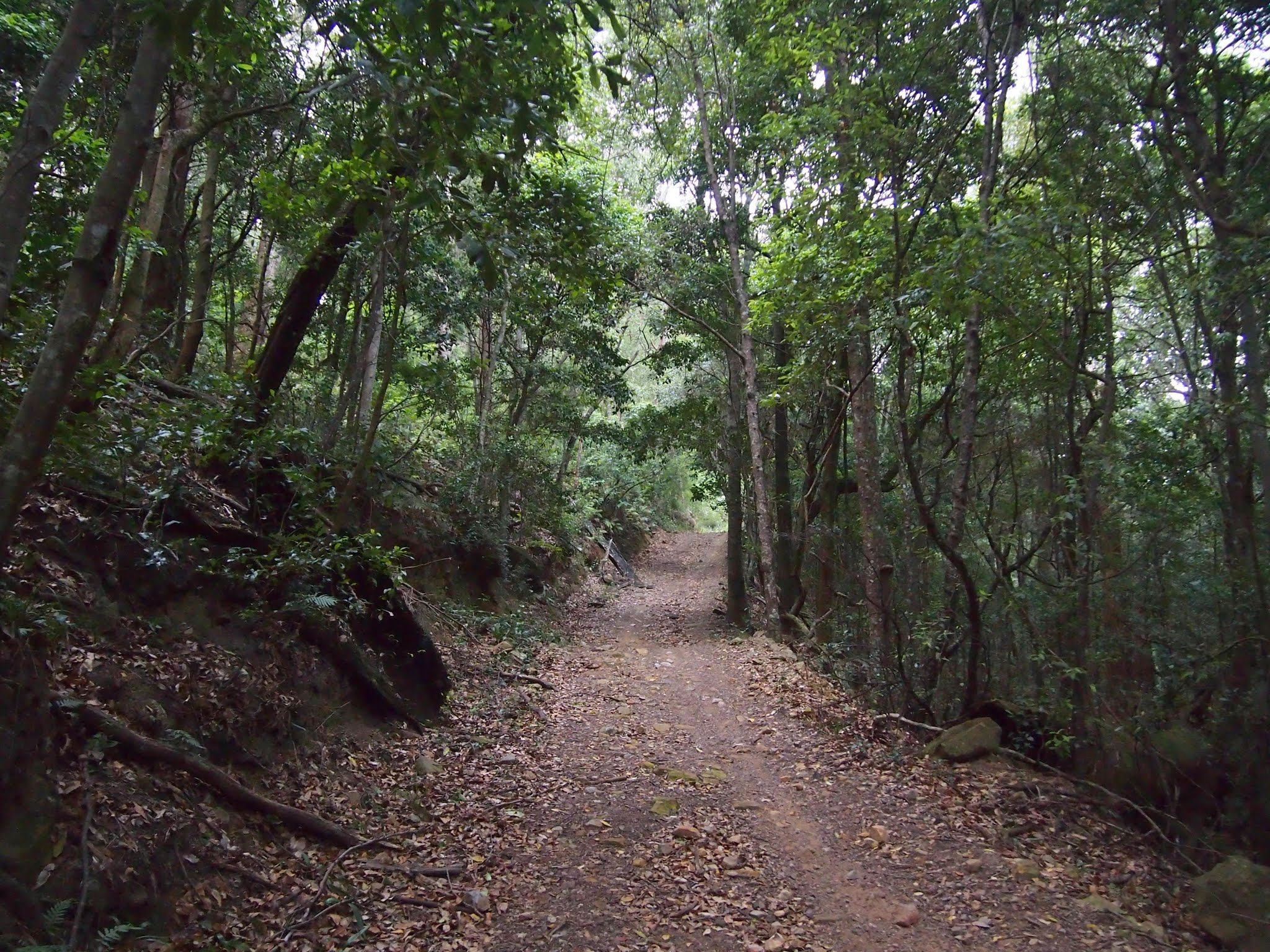
Burgh Track (#7)

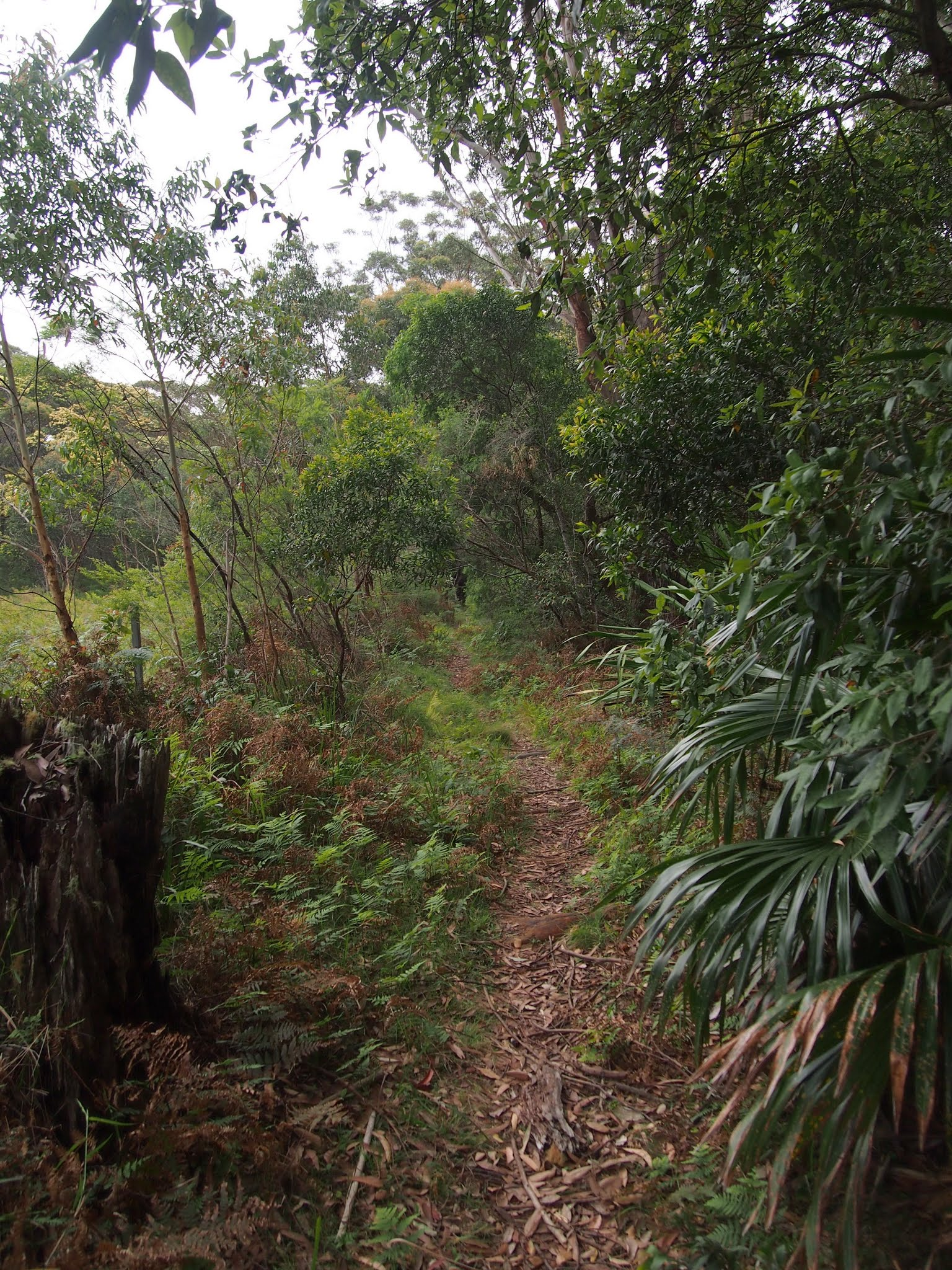
Burgh Track (#8)

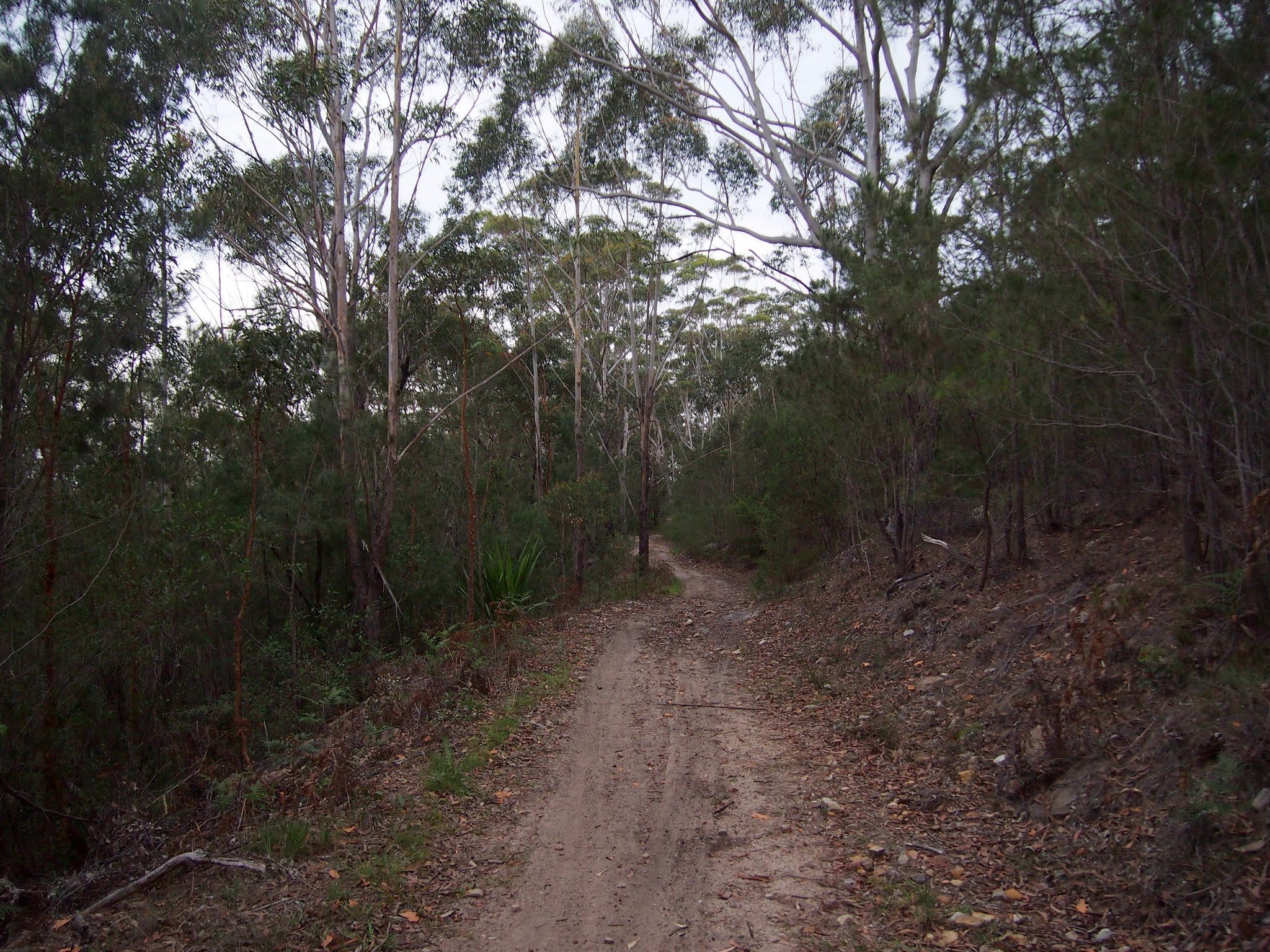
Burgh Track (#9)

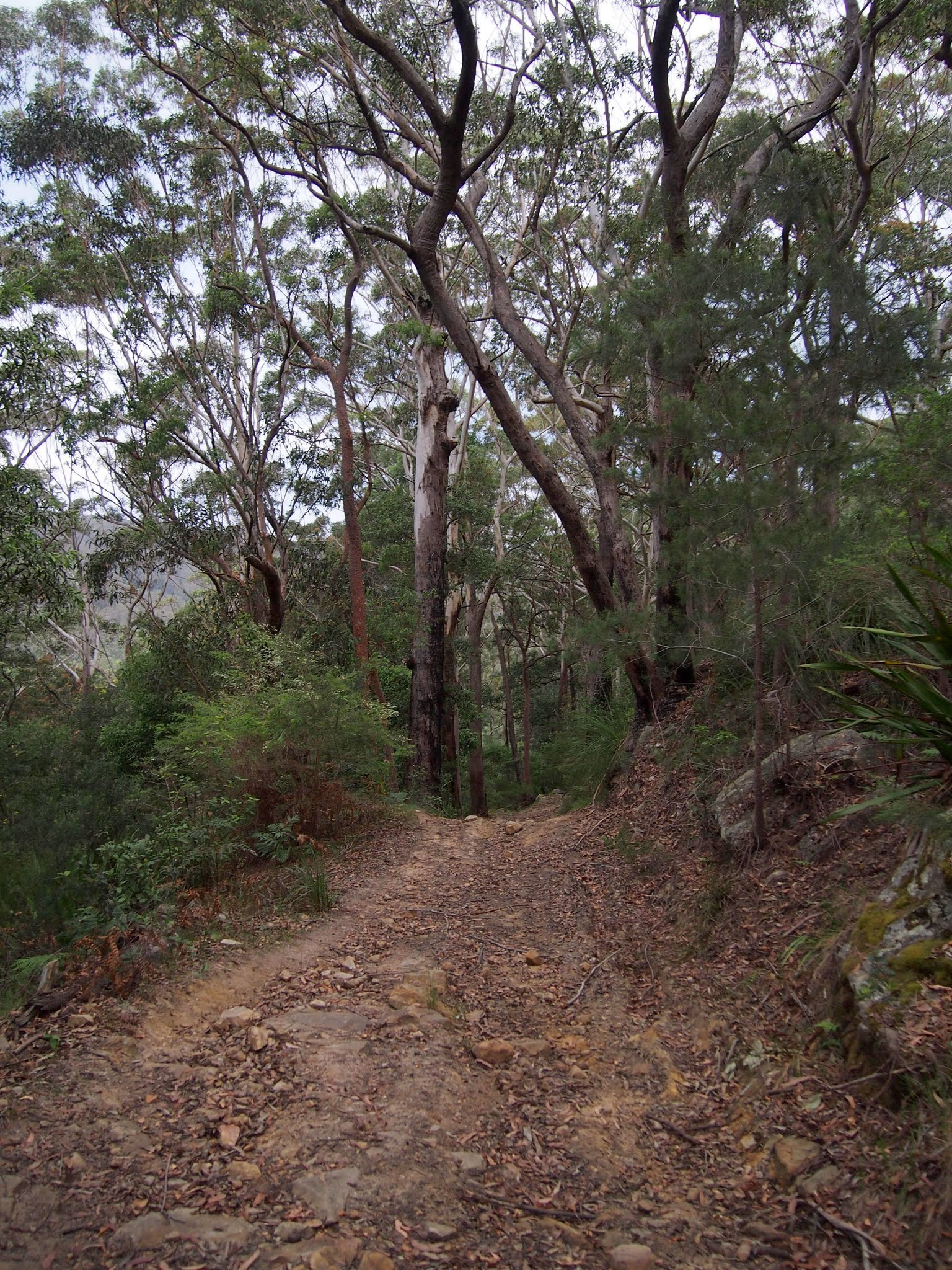
Burgh Track (#10)

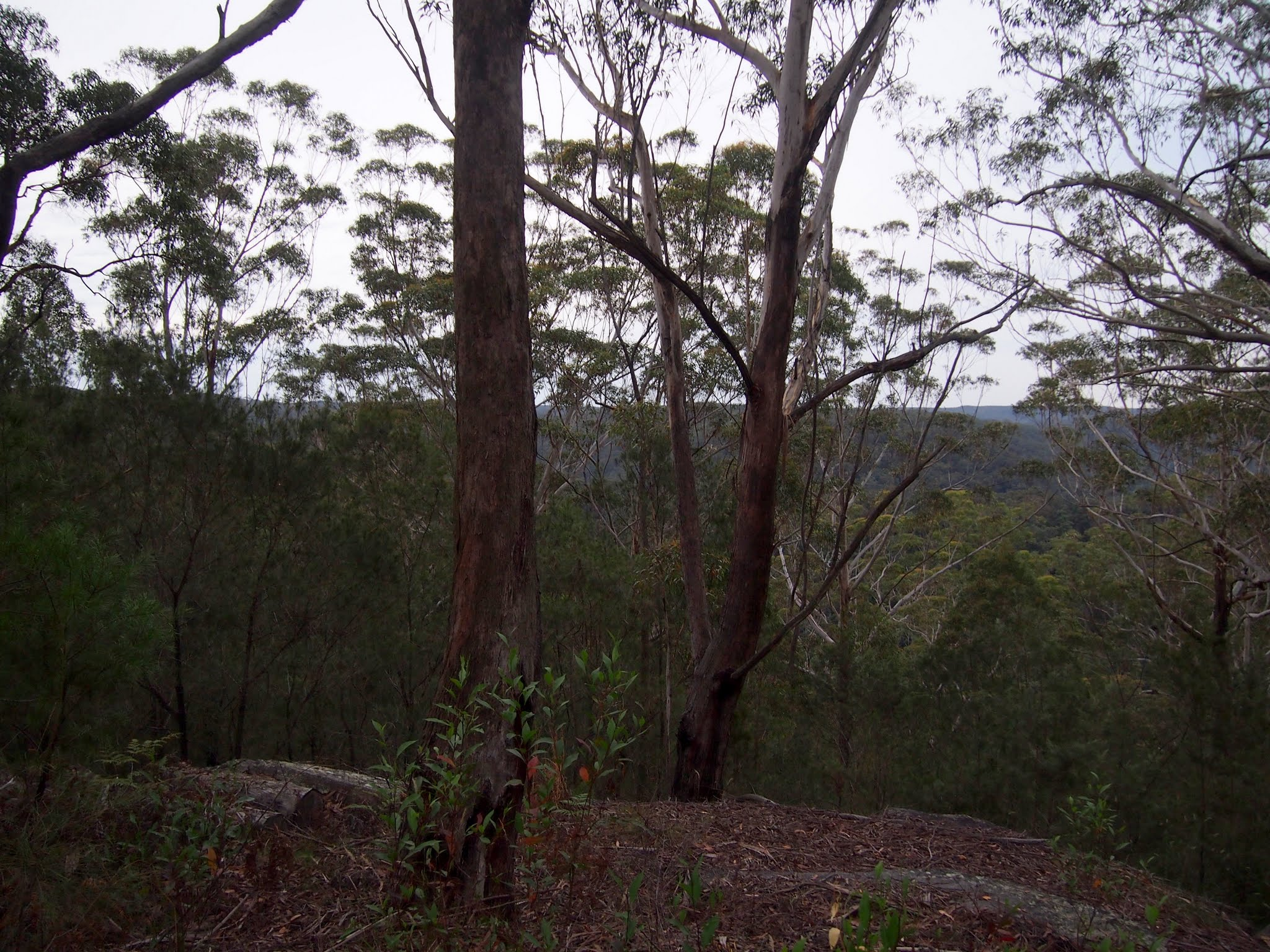
Burgh Track (#11)

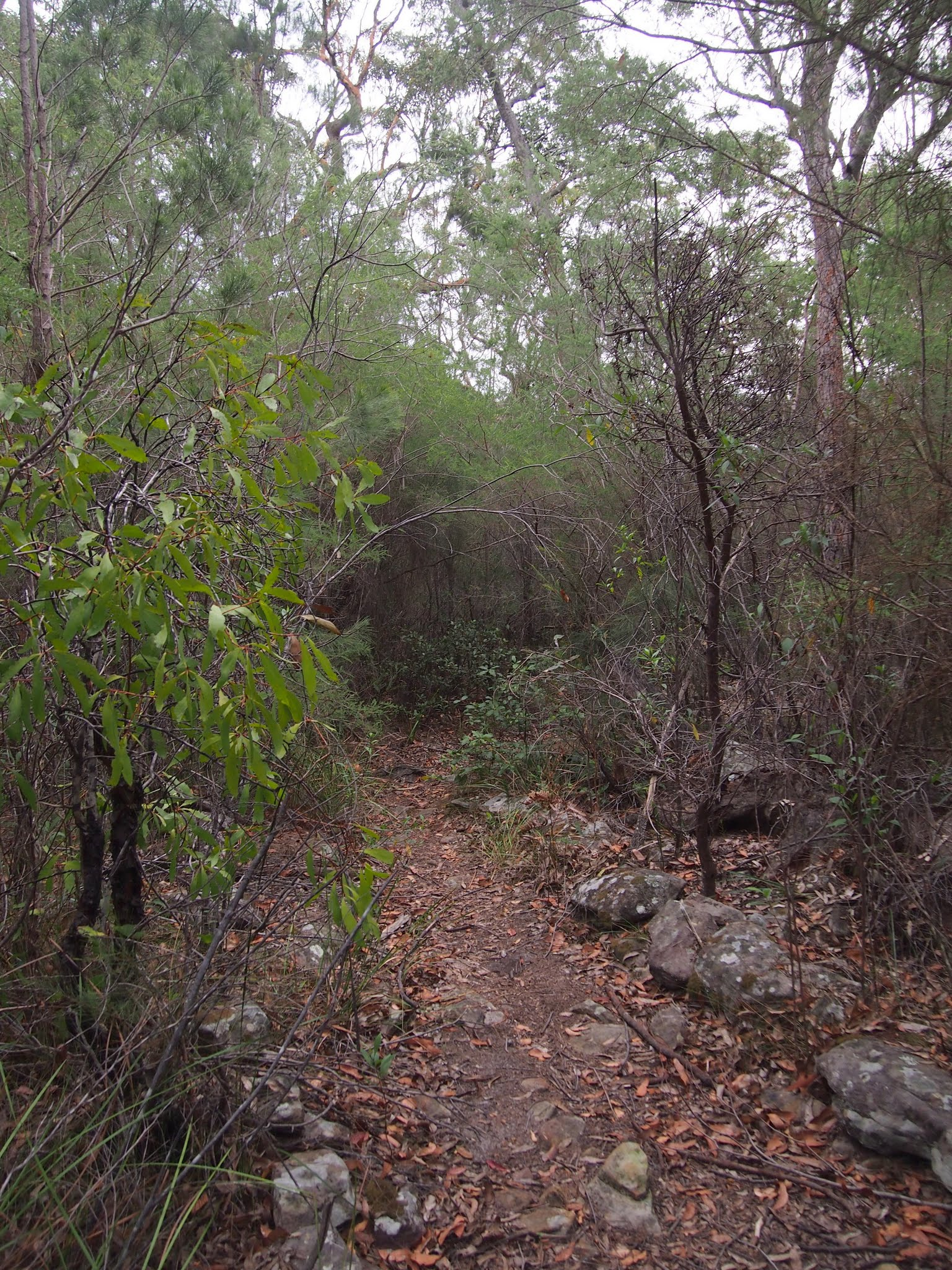
Burgh Track (#12)

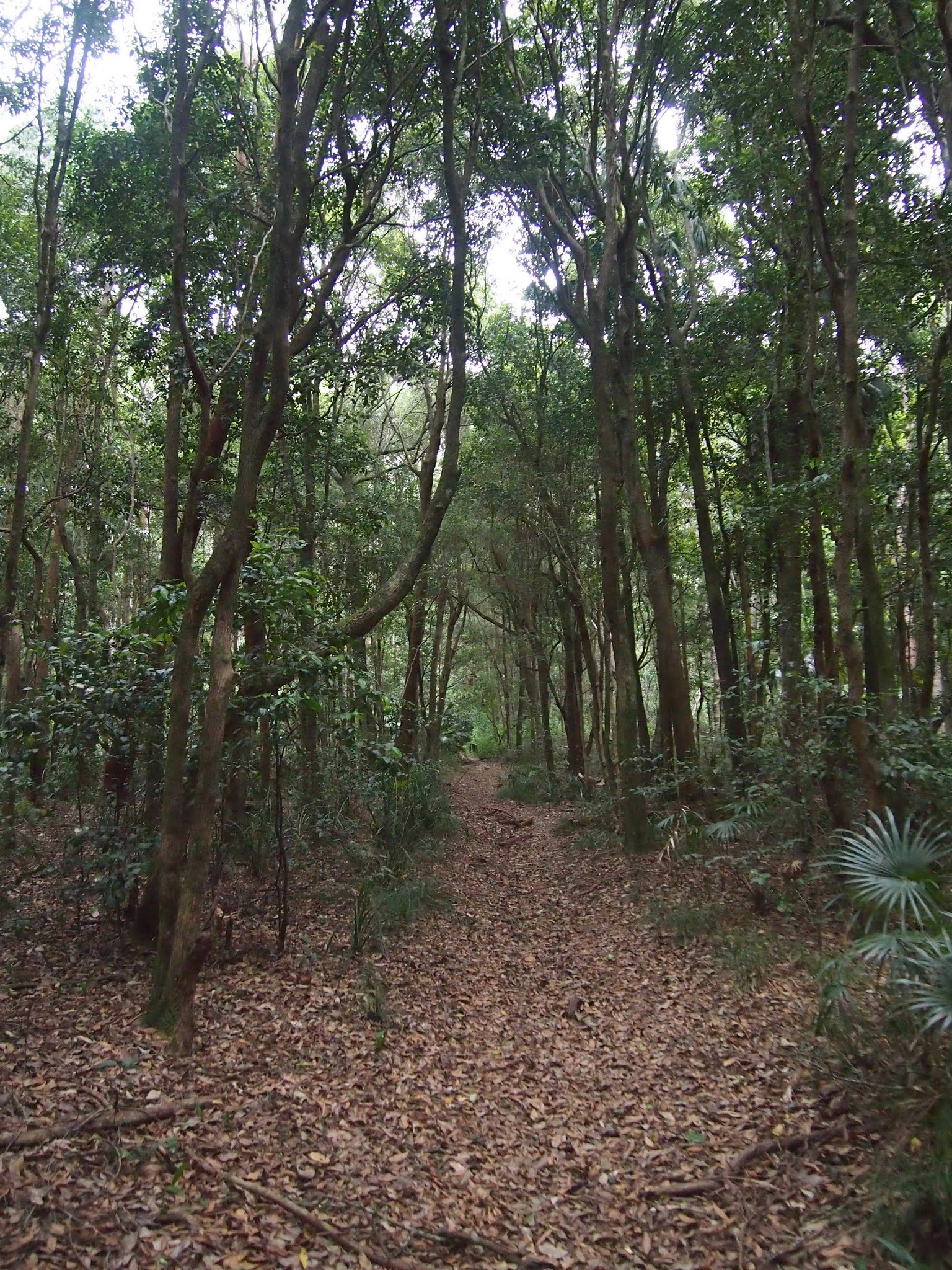
Burgh Track (#13)

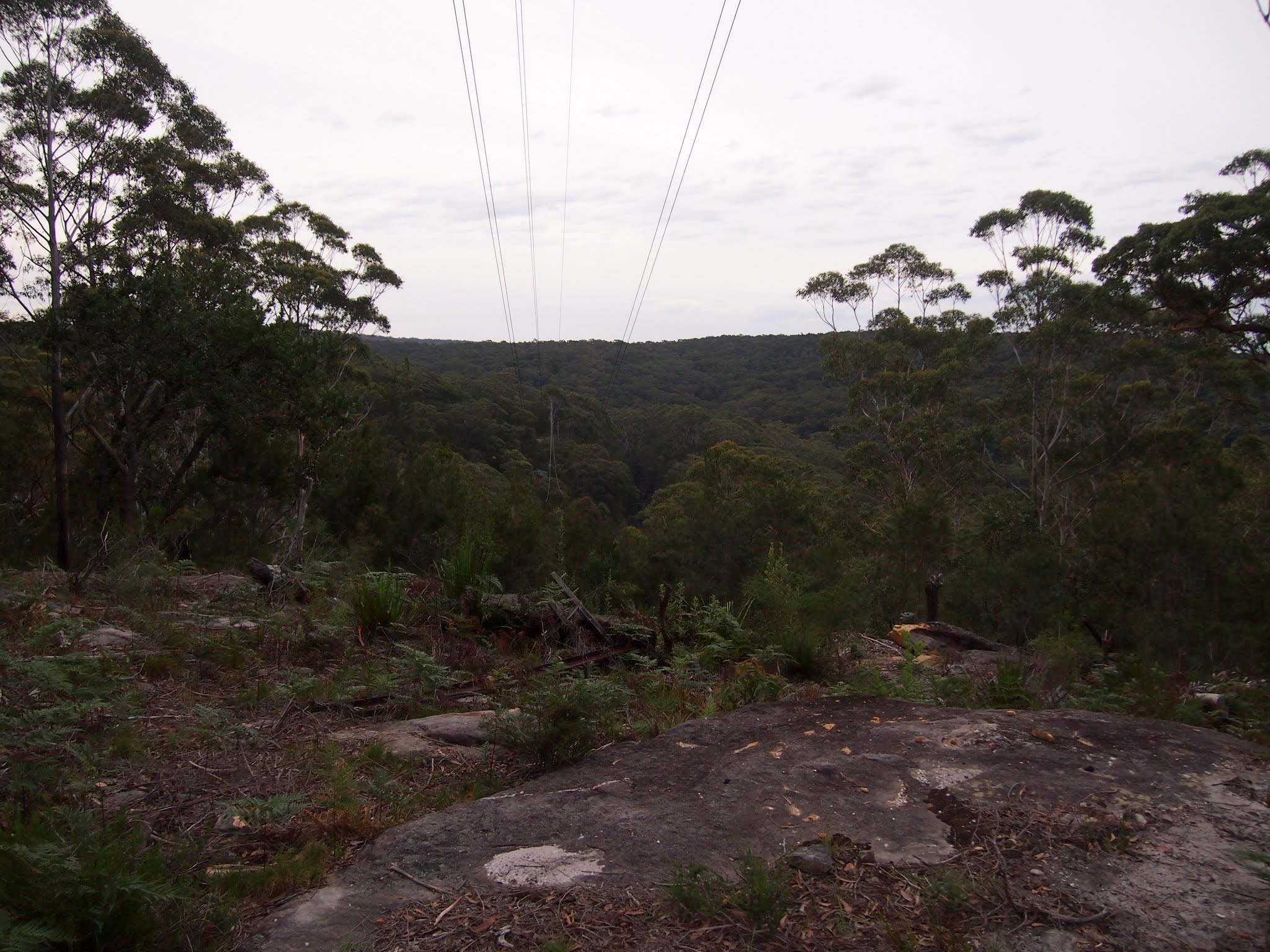
Burgh Track (#14)

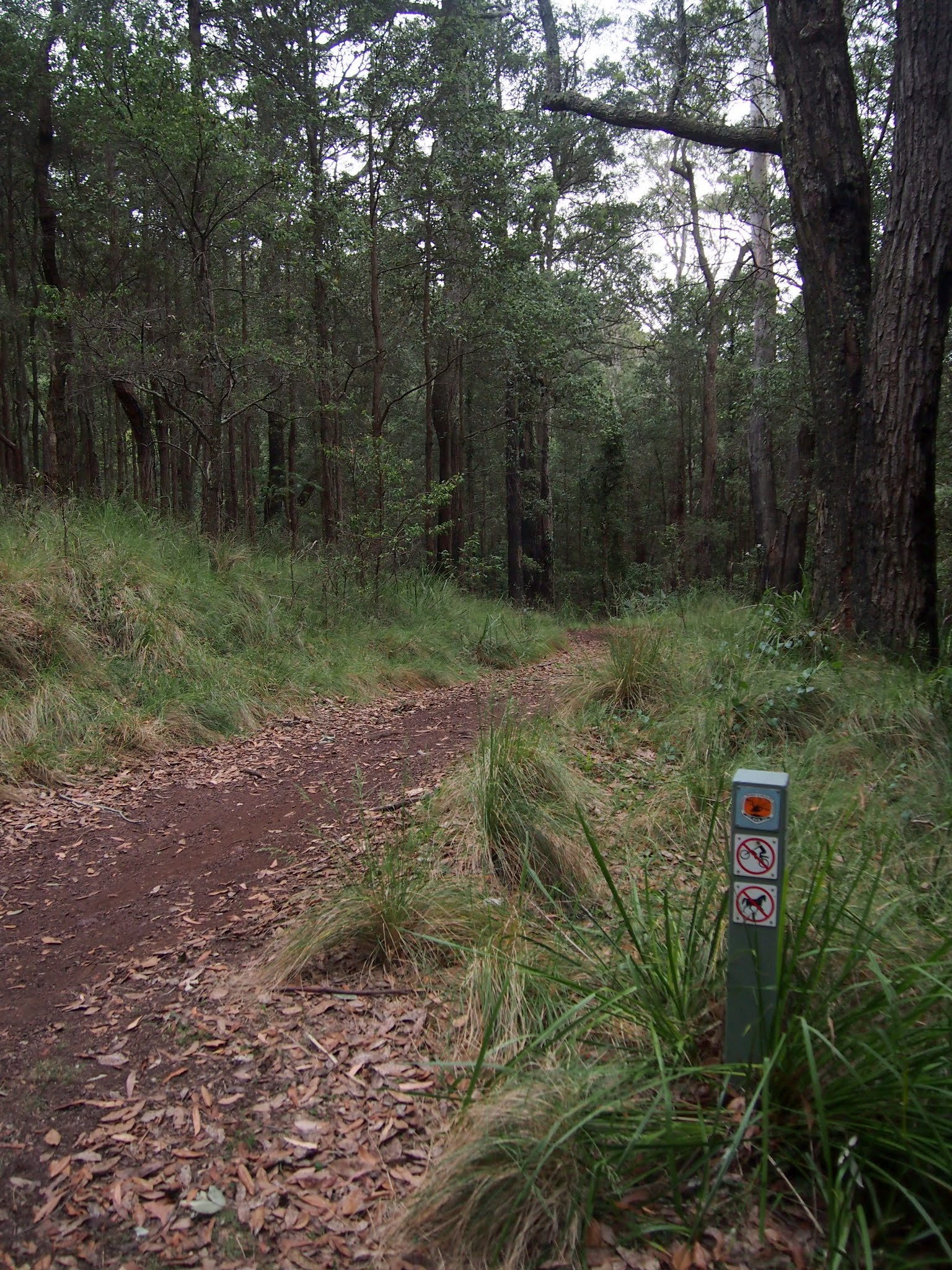
Burgh Track (#15)

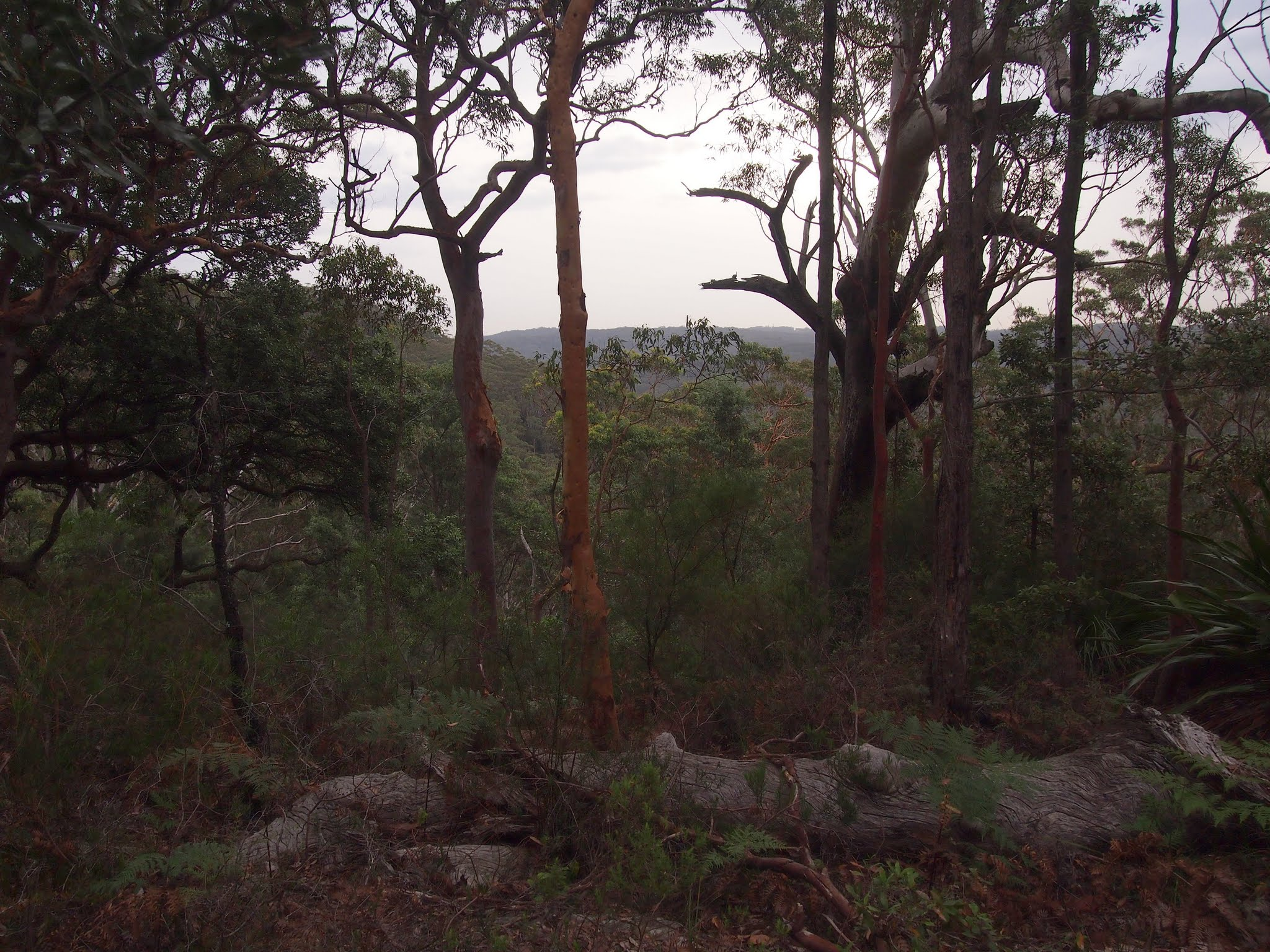
Burgh Track (#16)

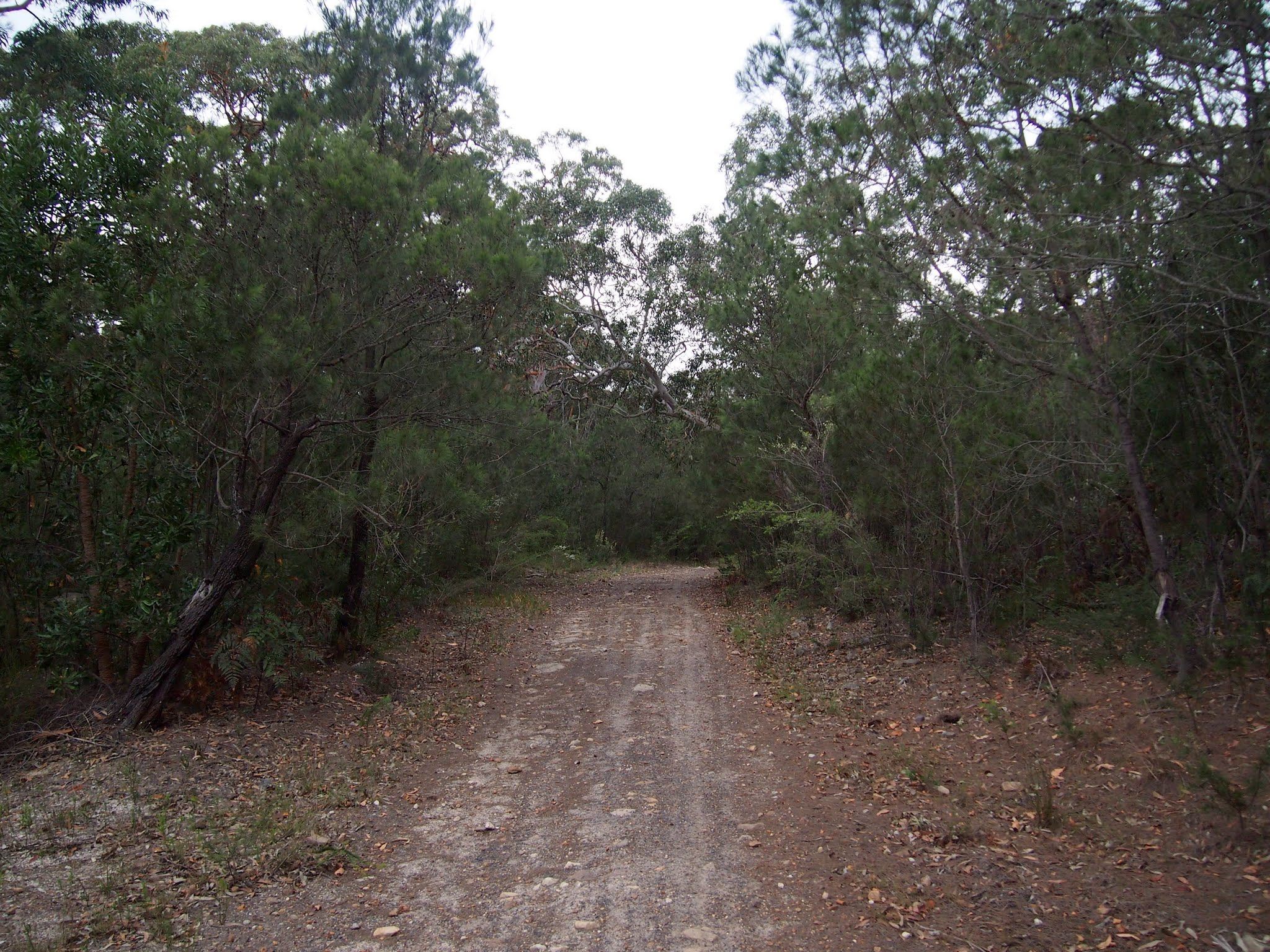
Burgh Track (#17)

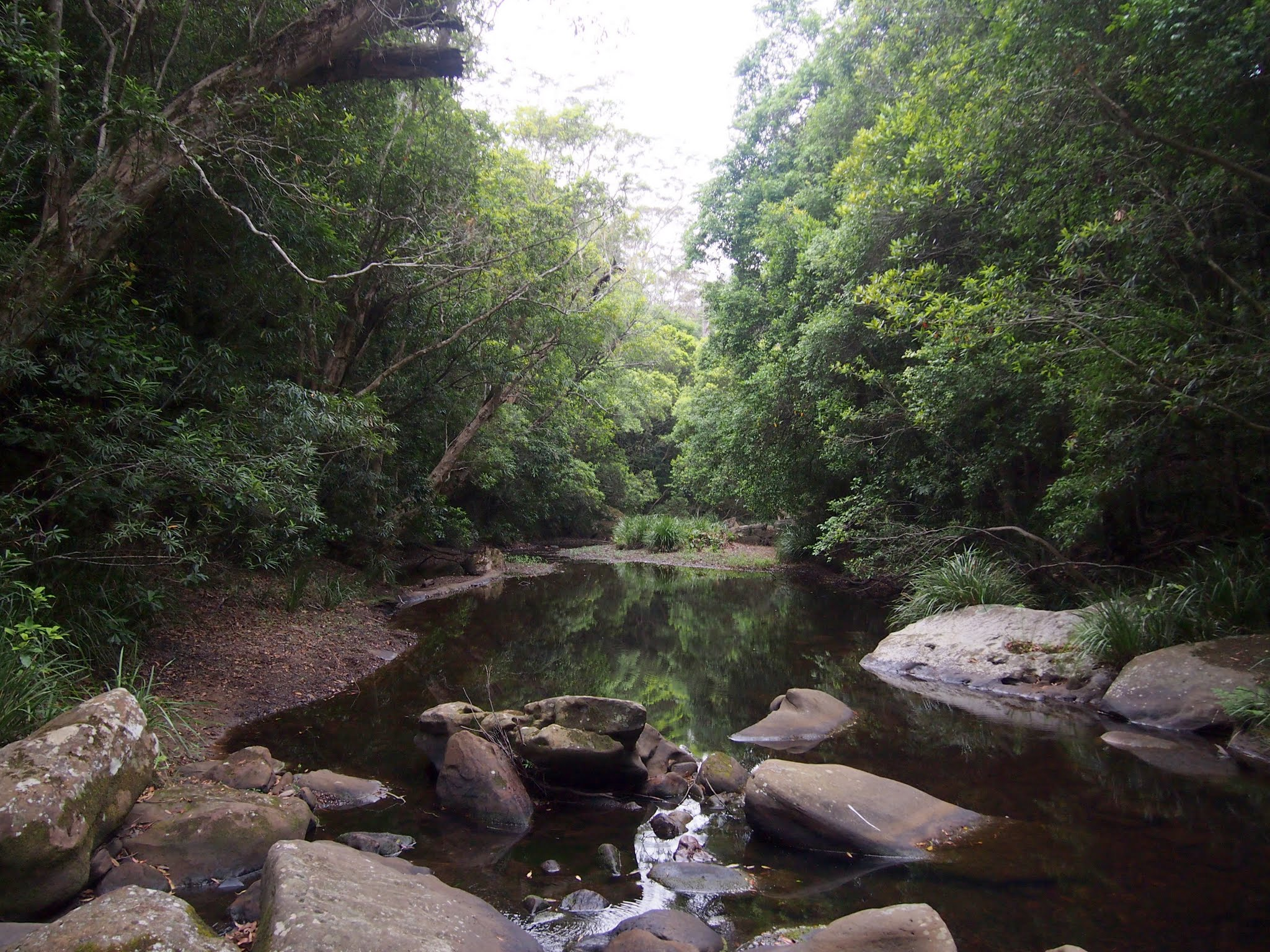
Burgh Track (#18)

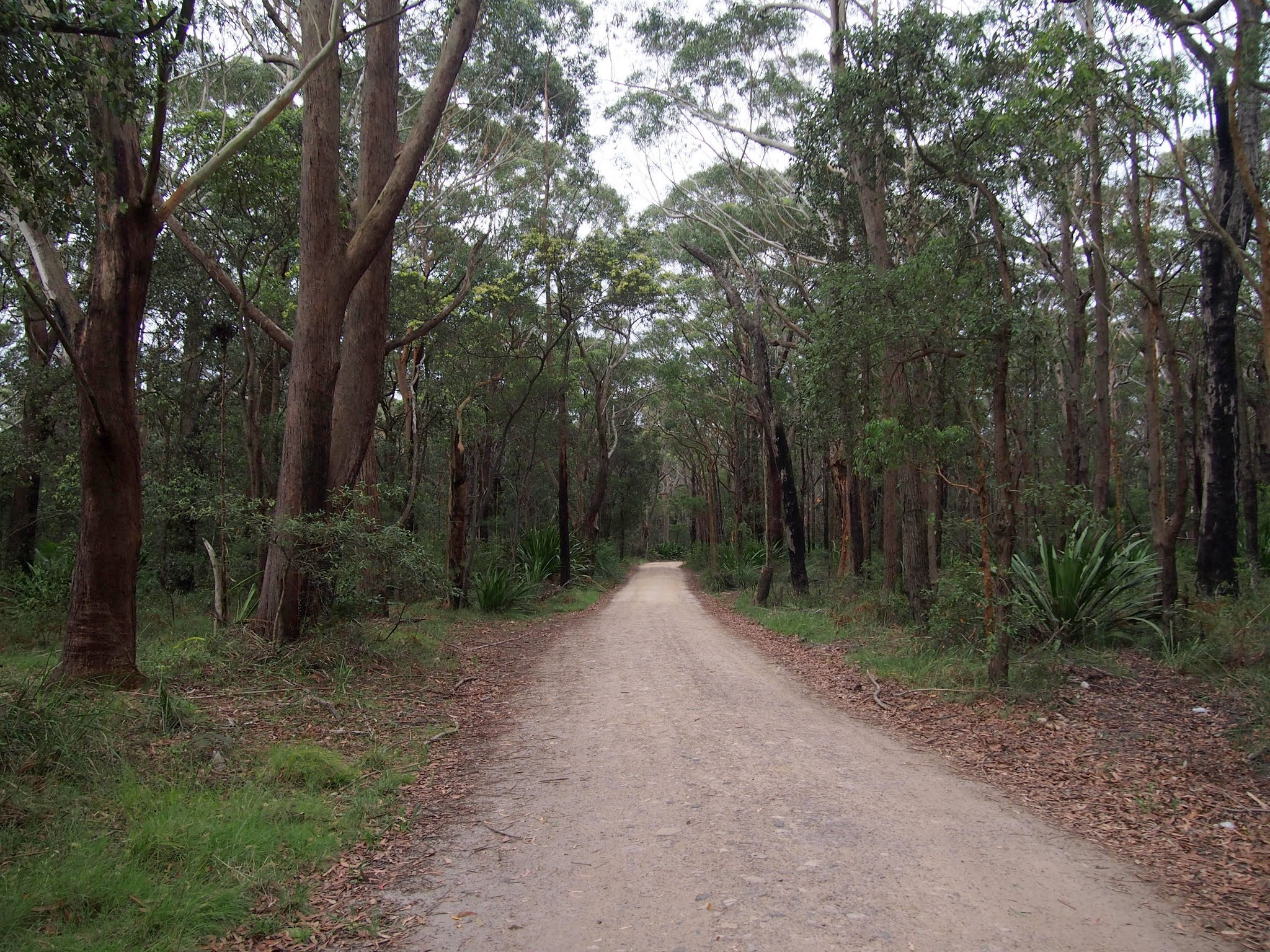
Garawarra Ridge (#5)

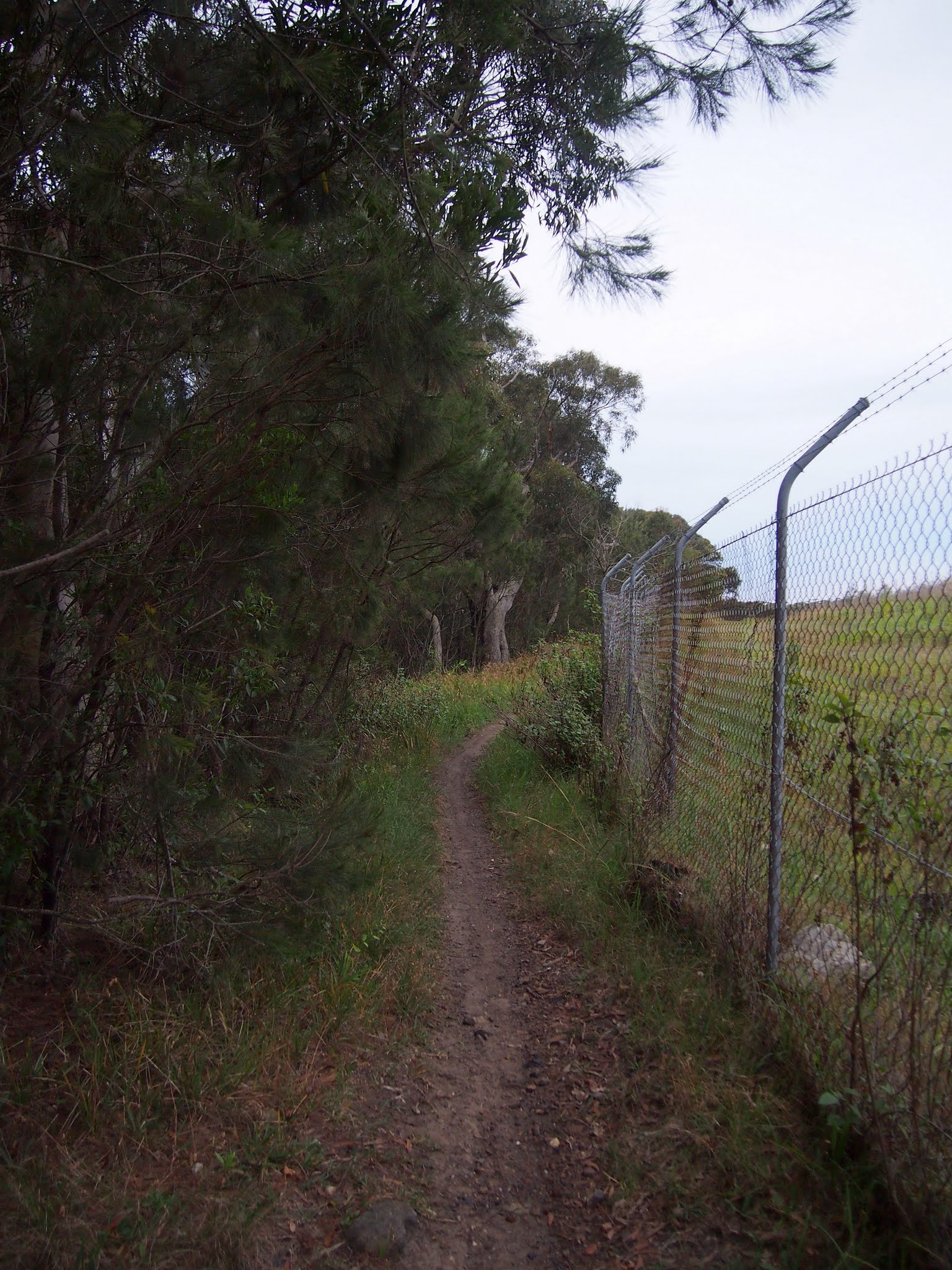
Burgh Track (#19)

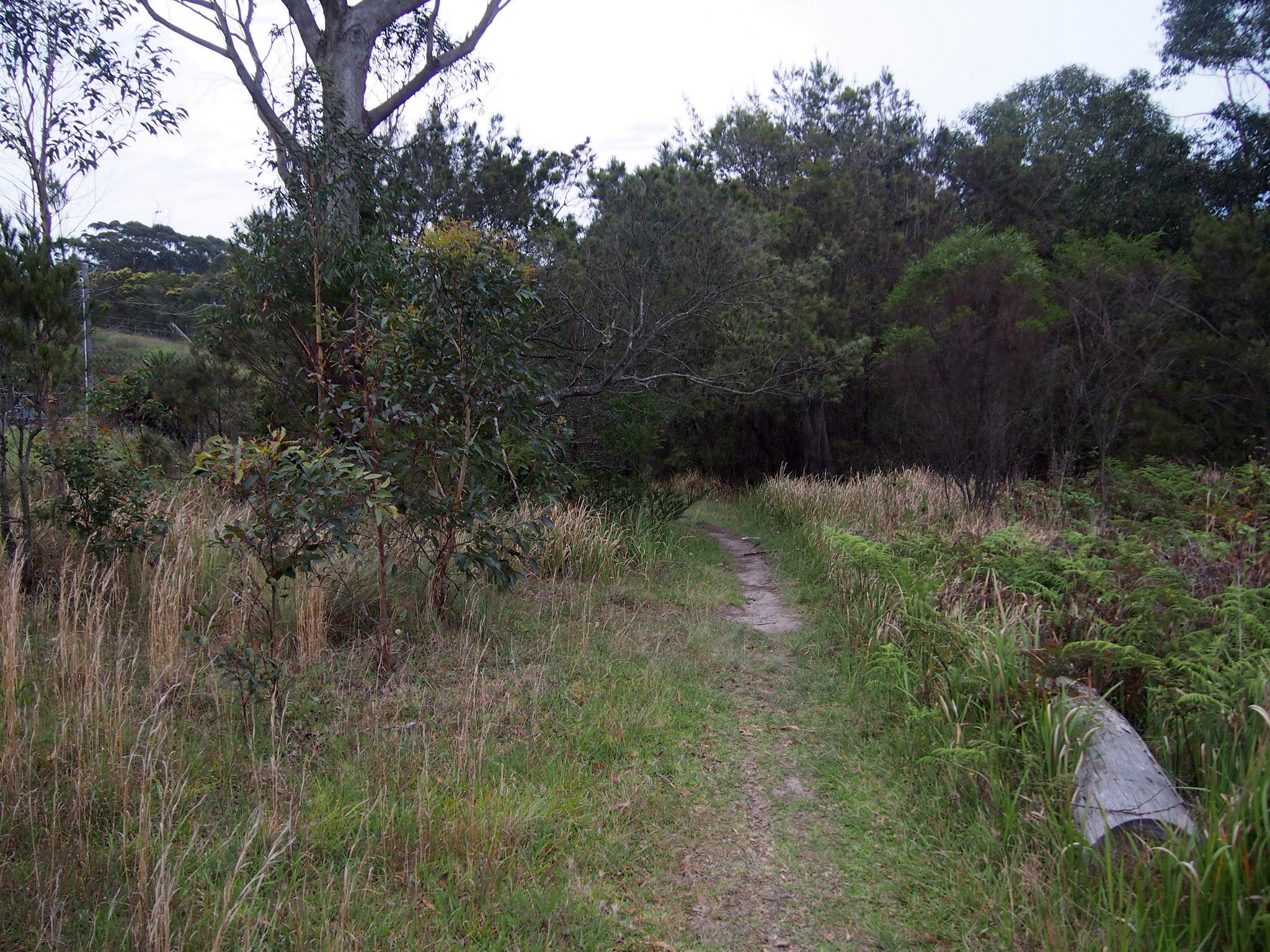
Burgh Track (#20)

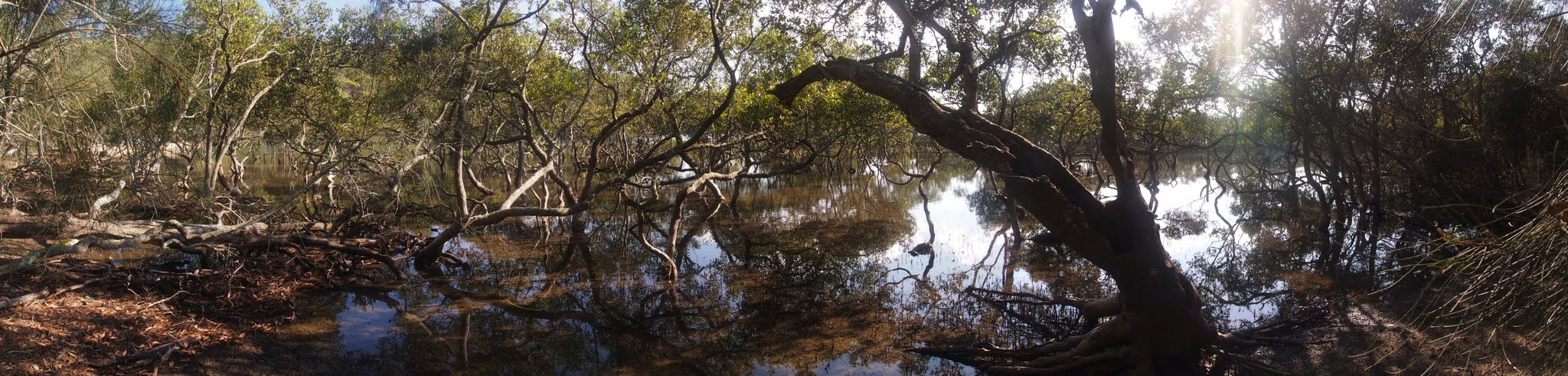
Bonnie Vale (#1)

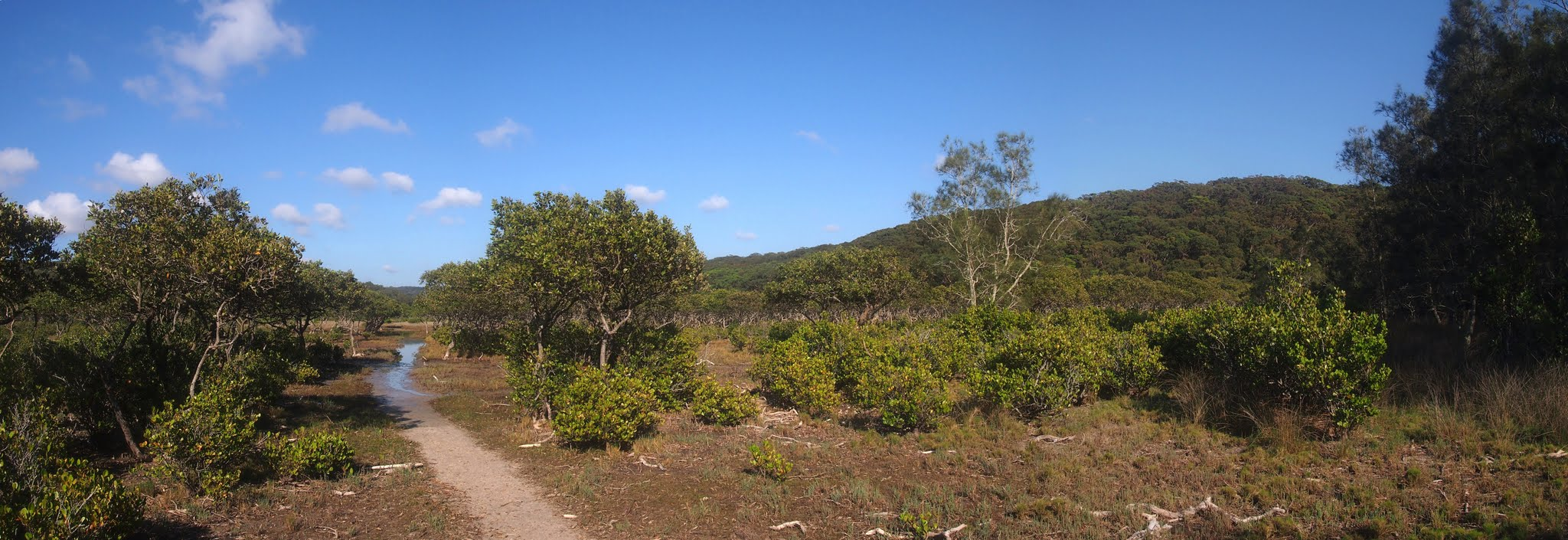
Bonnie Vale (#2)

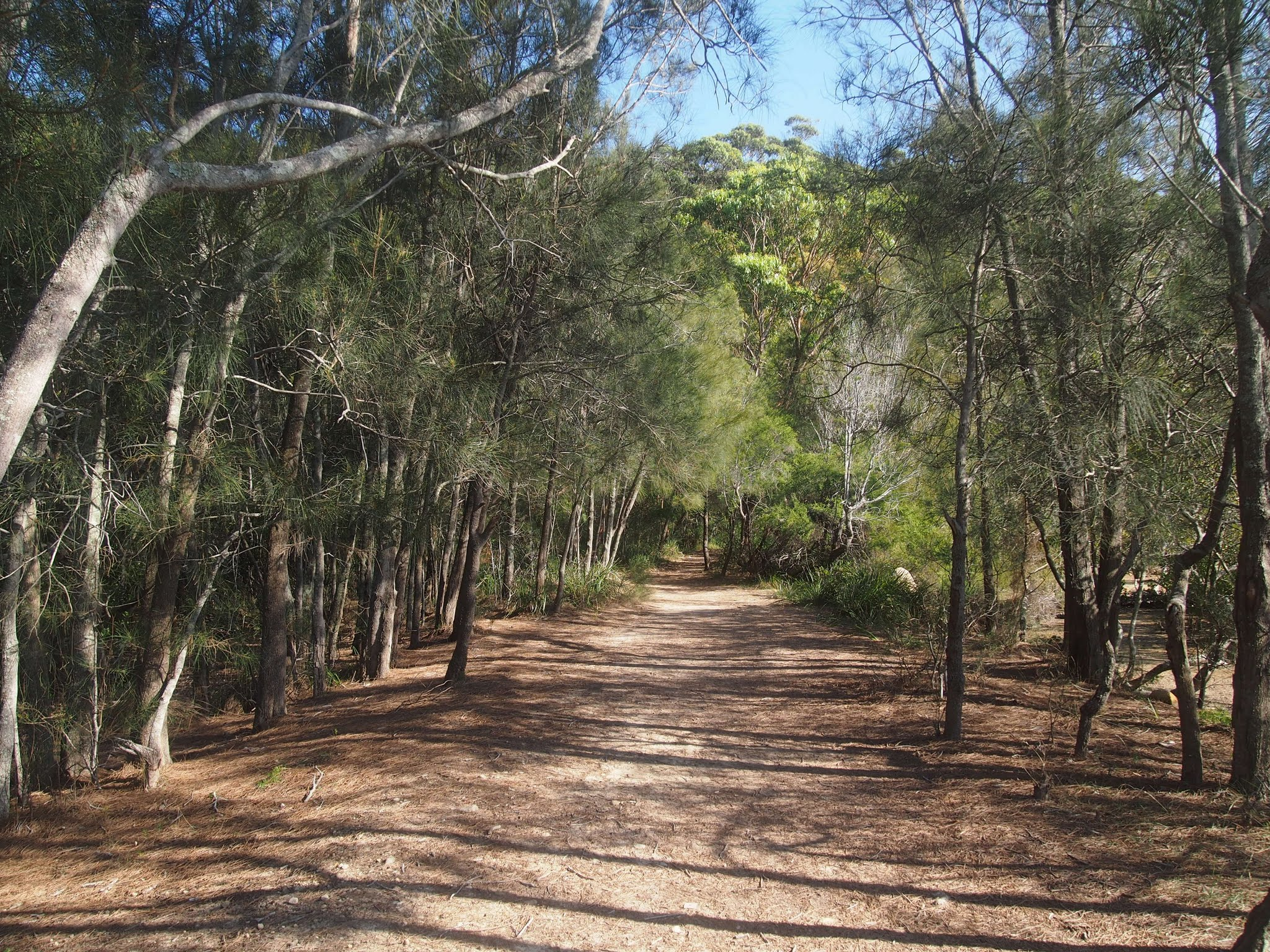
Bonnie Vale (#3)

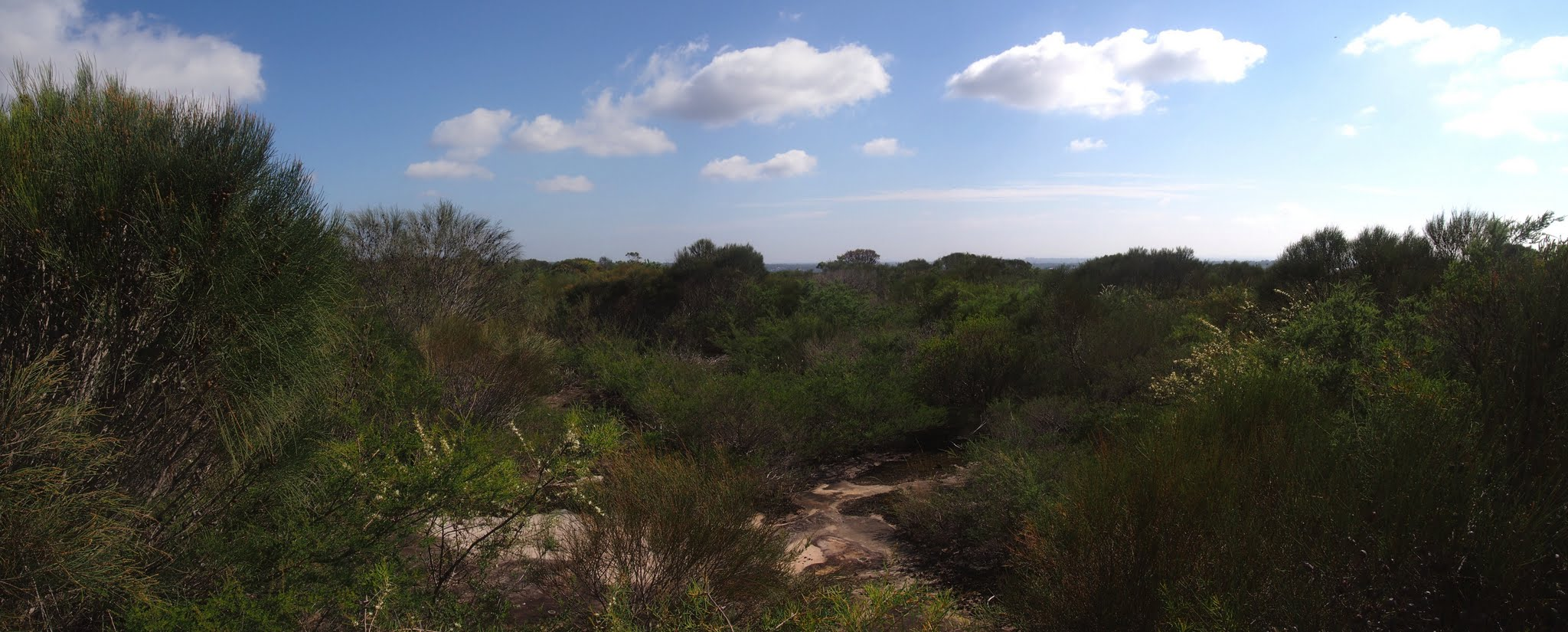
Maianbar Road

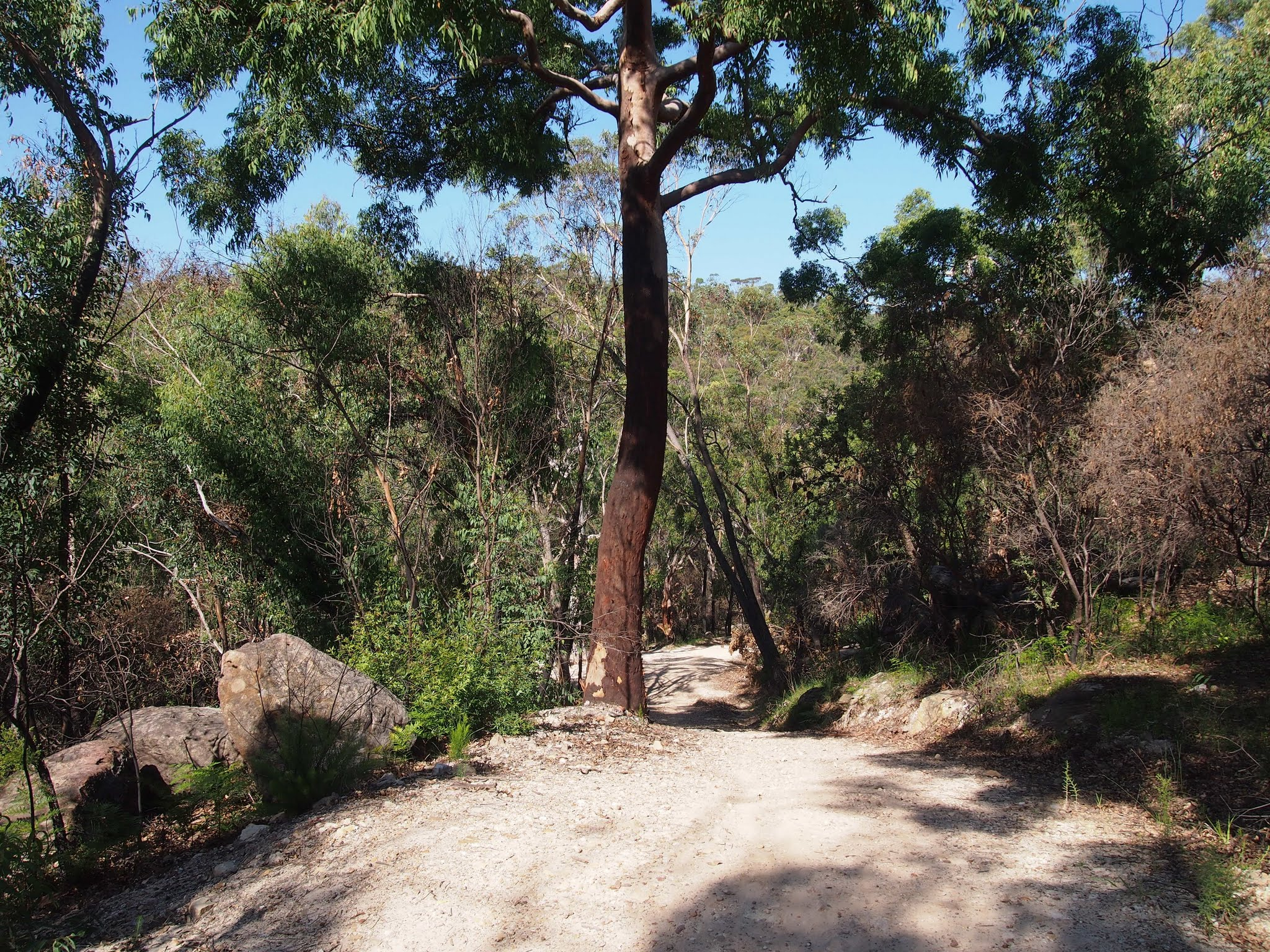
Temptation Creek Trail (#1)

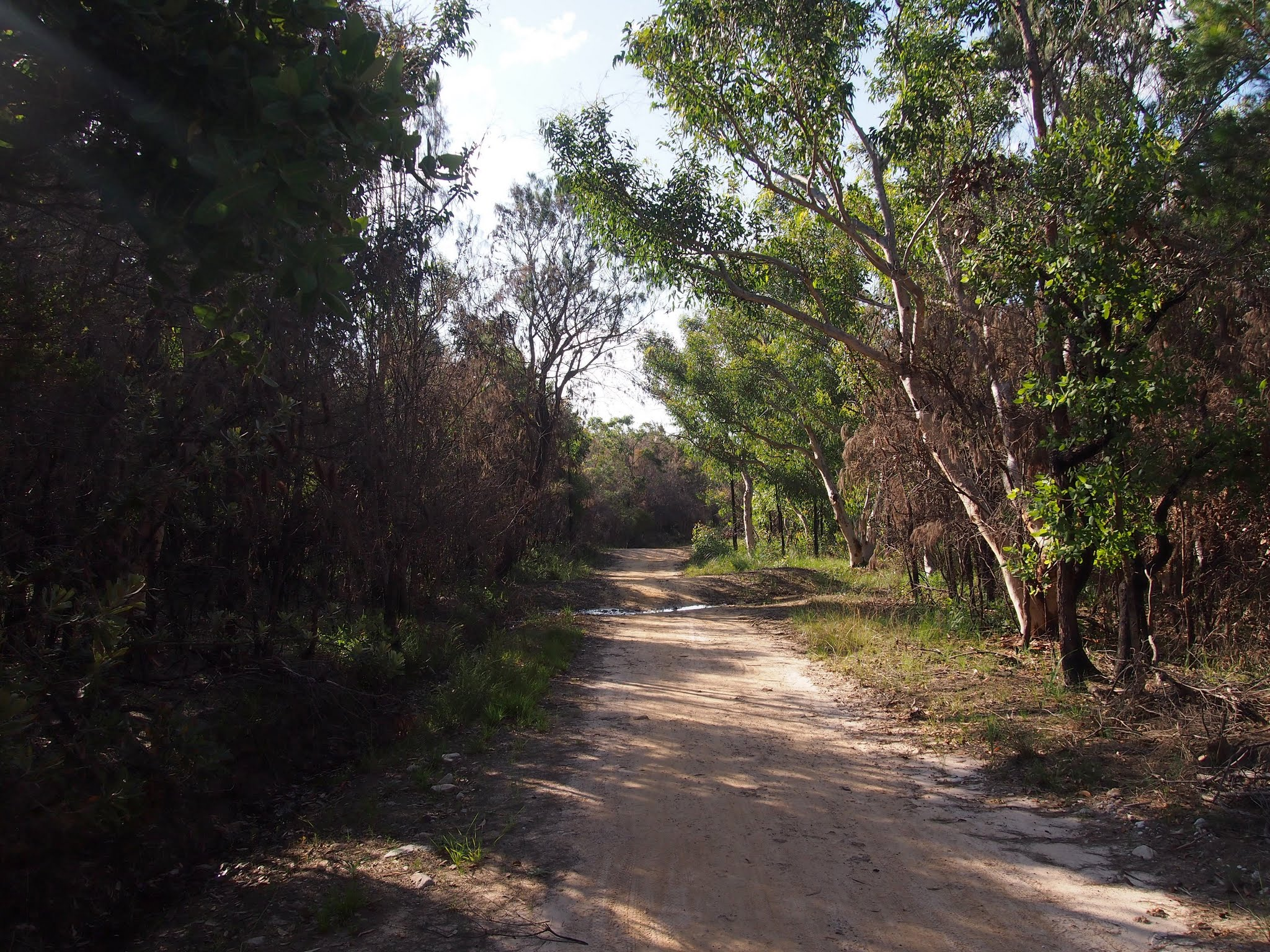
Temptation Creek Trail (#2)

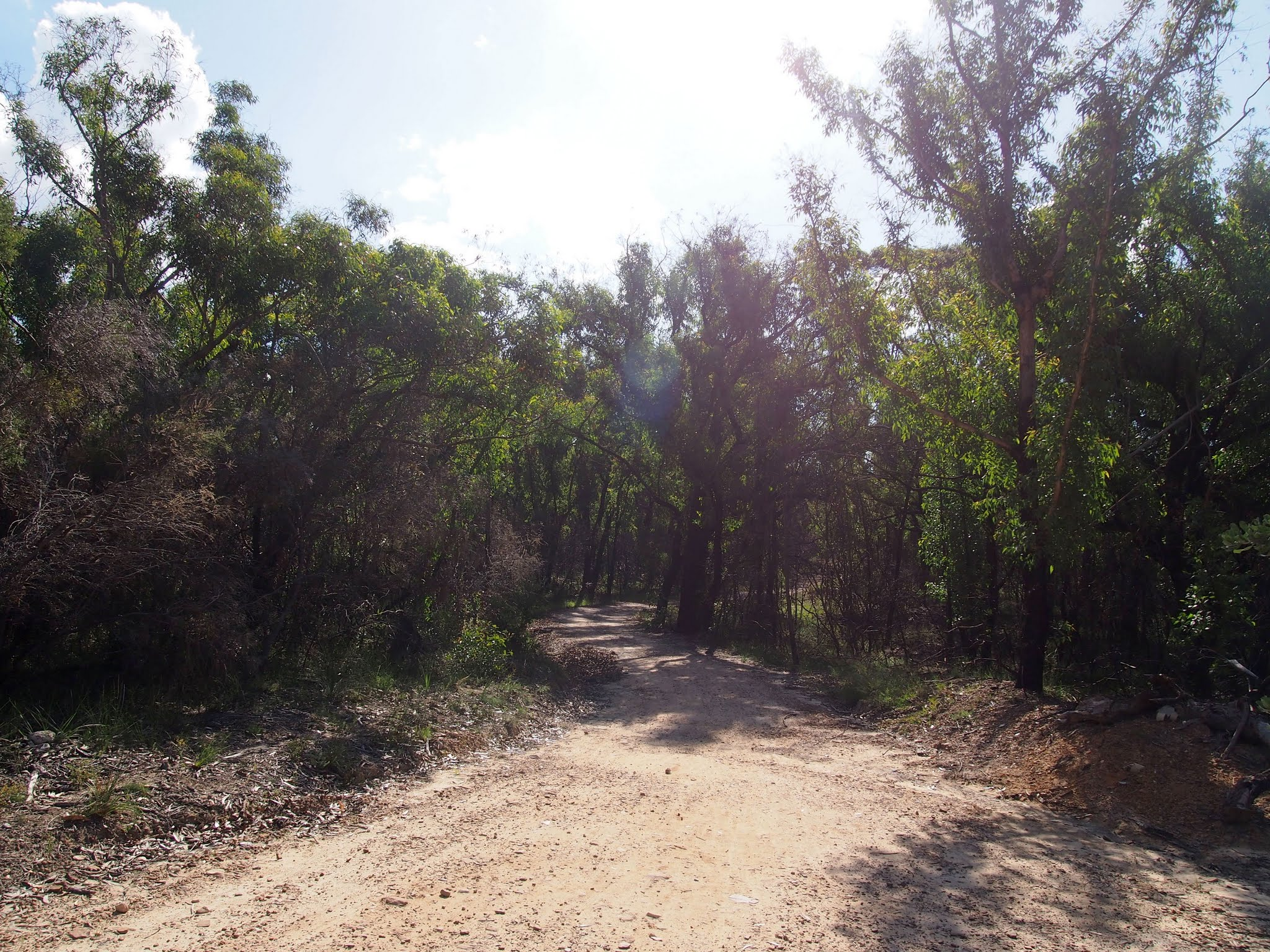
Temptation Creek Trail (#3)

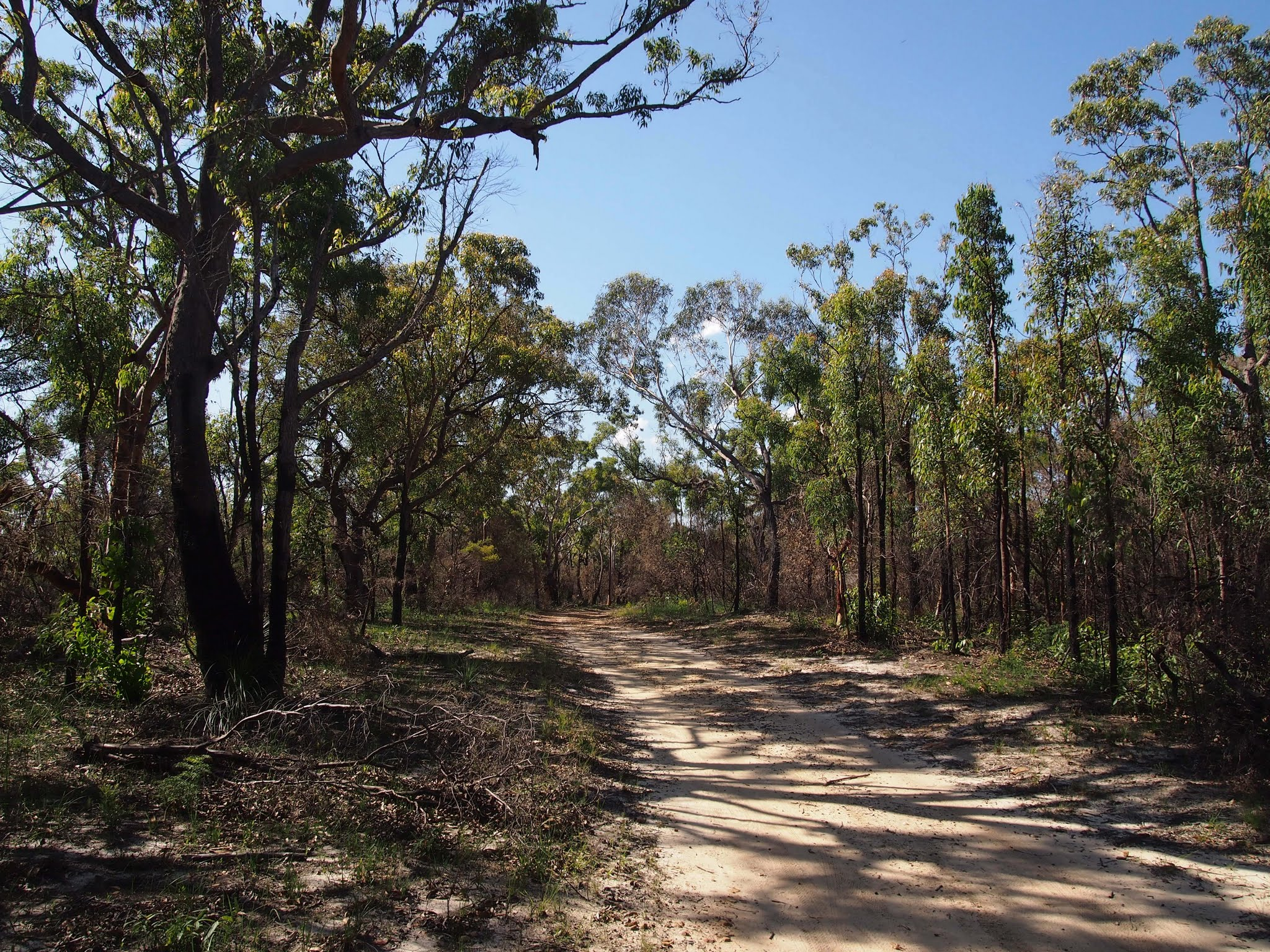
Temptation Creek Trail (#4)

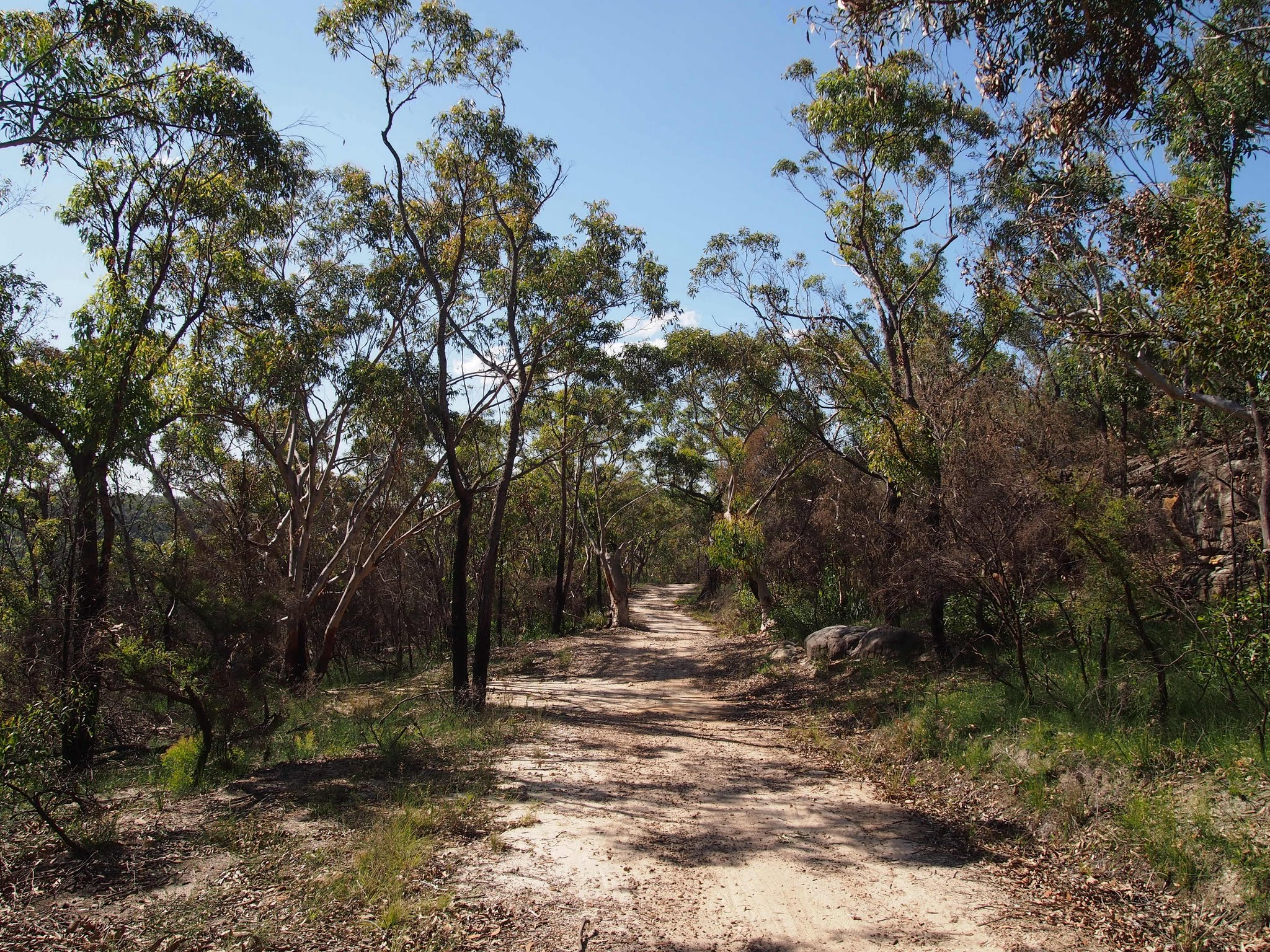
Temptation Creek Trail (#5)

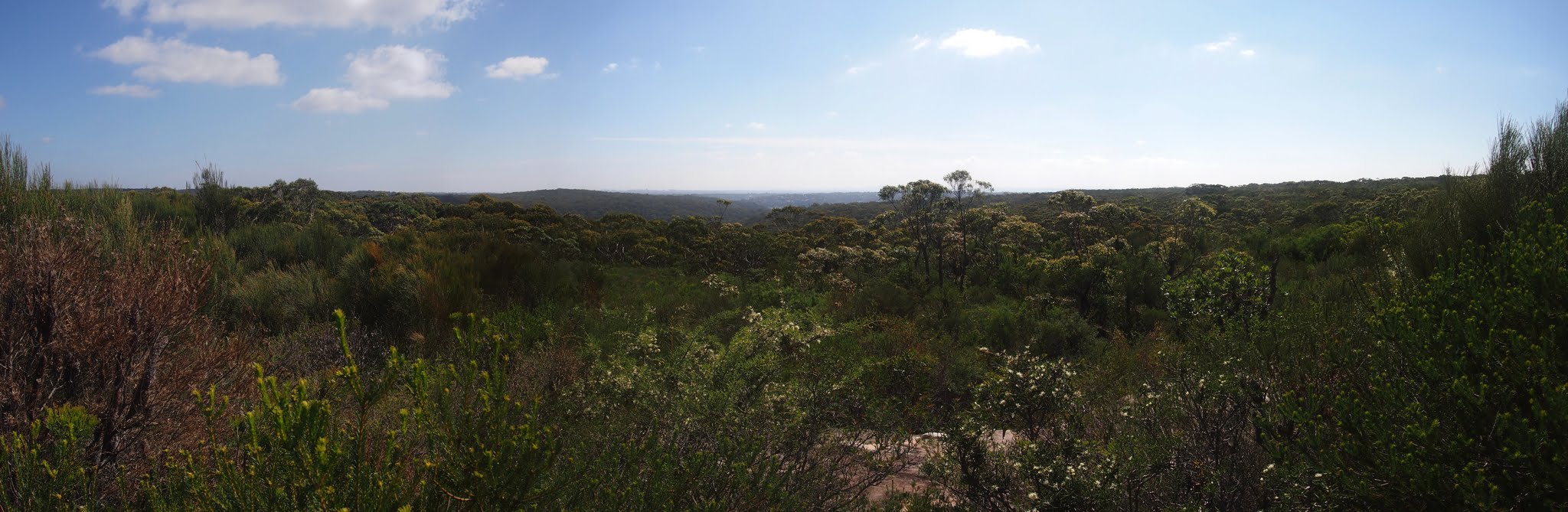
Anice Falls Track (#1)

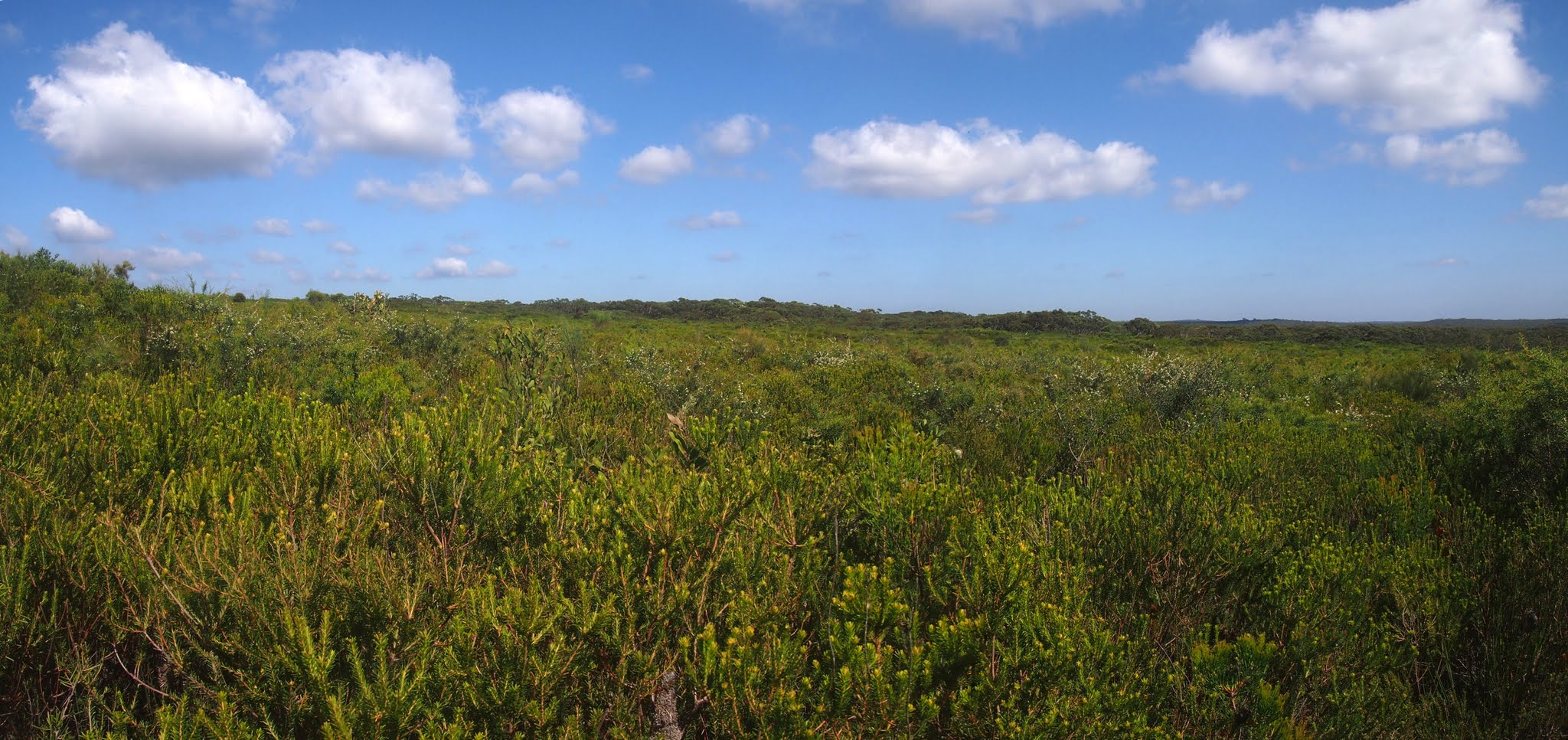
Anice Falls Track (#2)

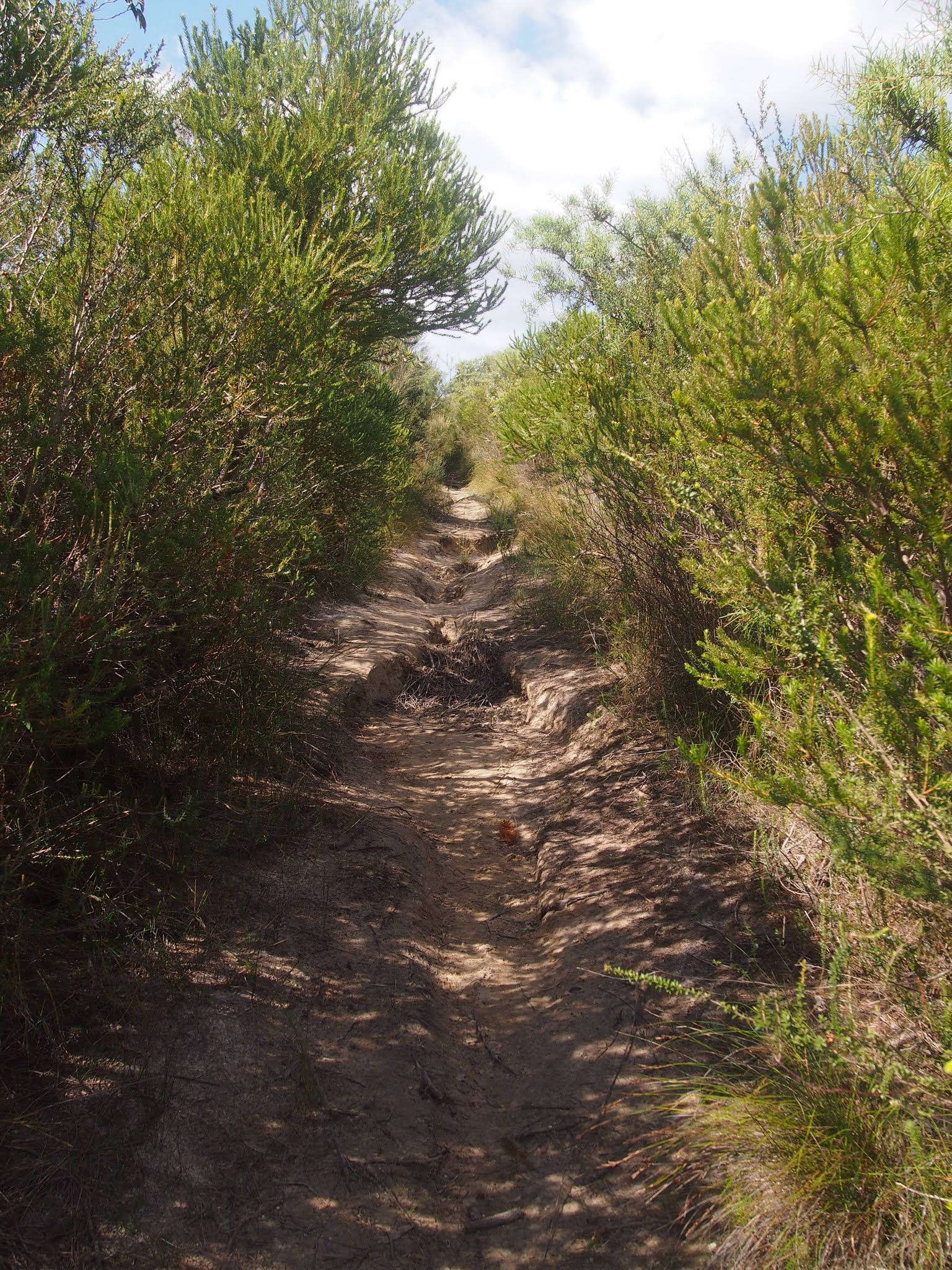
Anice Falls Track (#3)

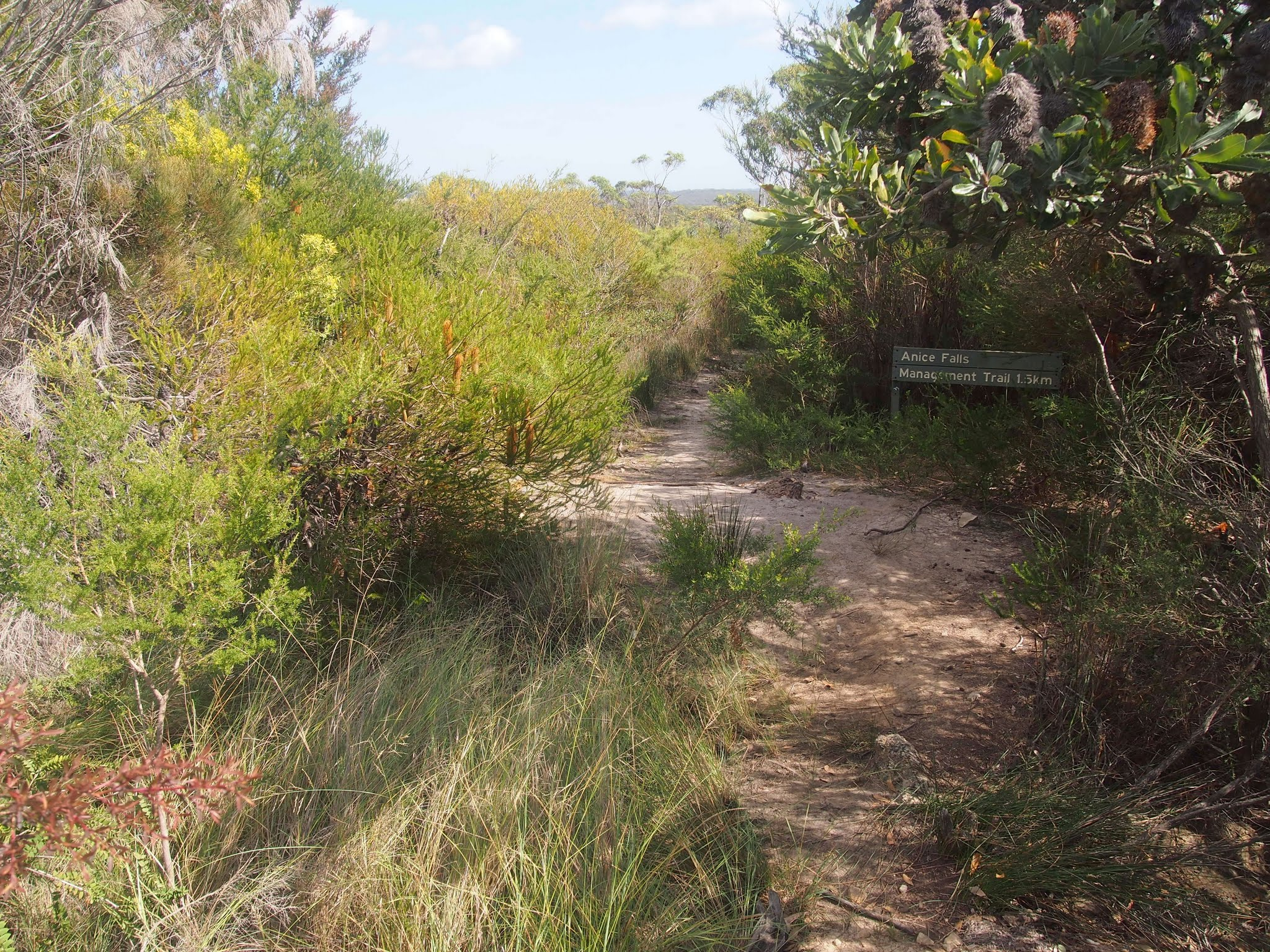
Anice Falls Track (#4)

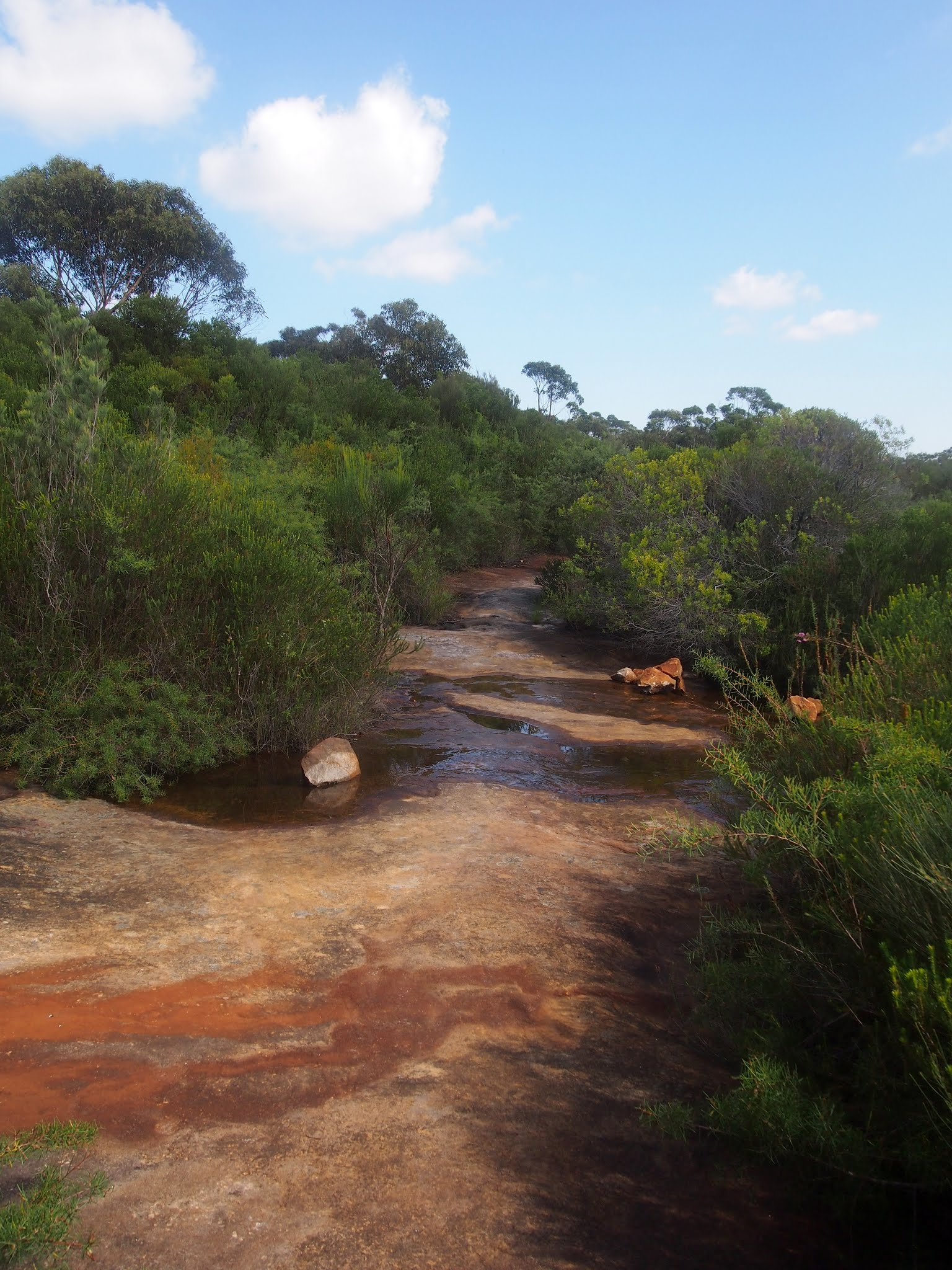
Anice Falls Track (#5)

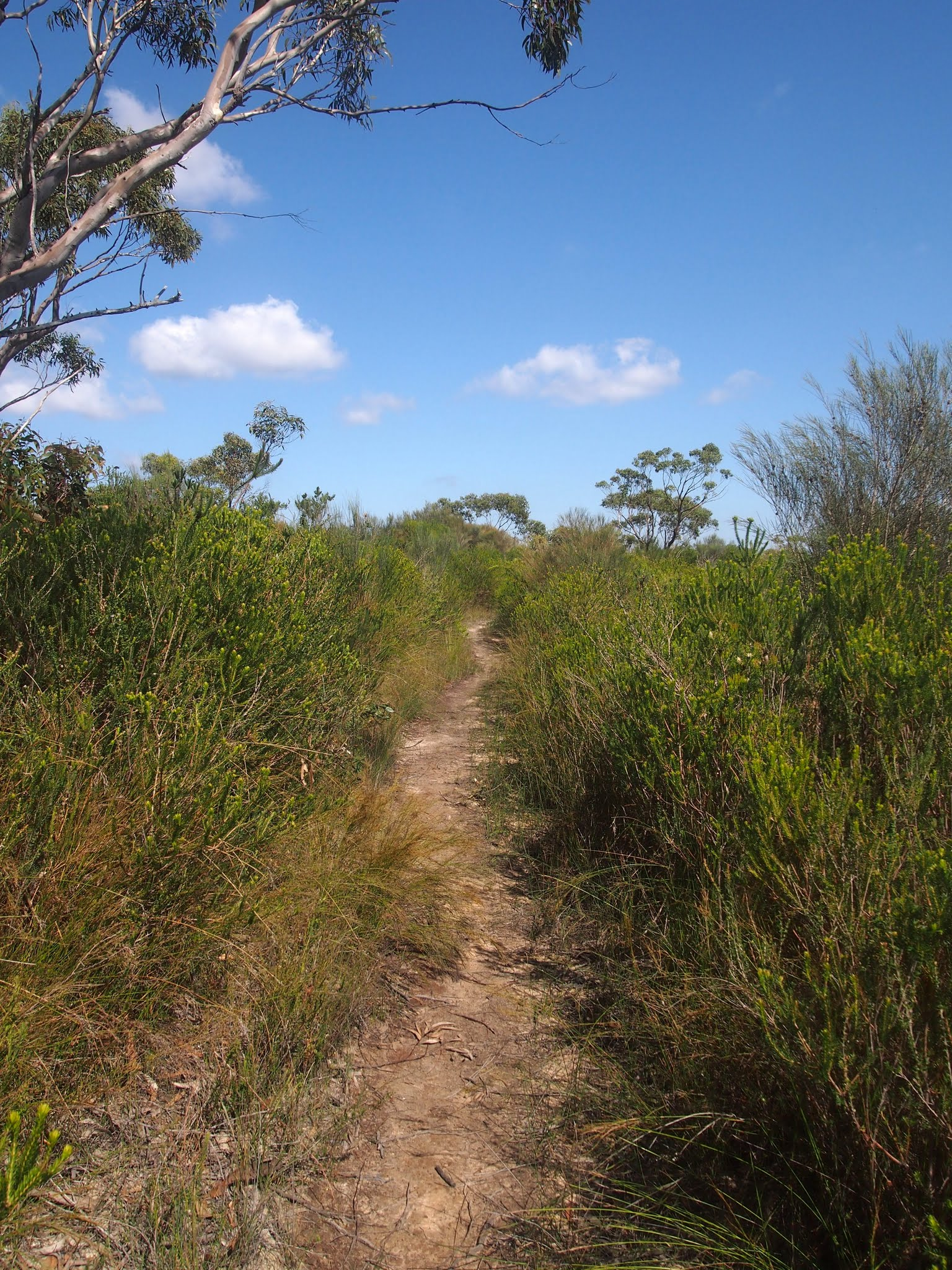
Anice Falls Track (#6)

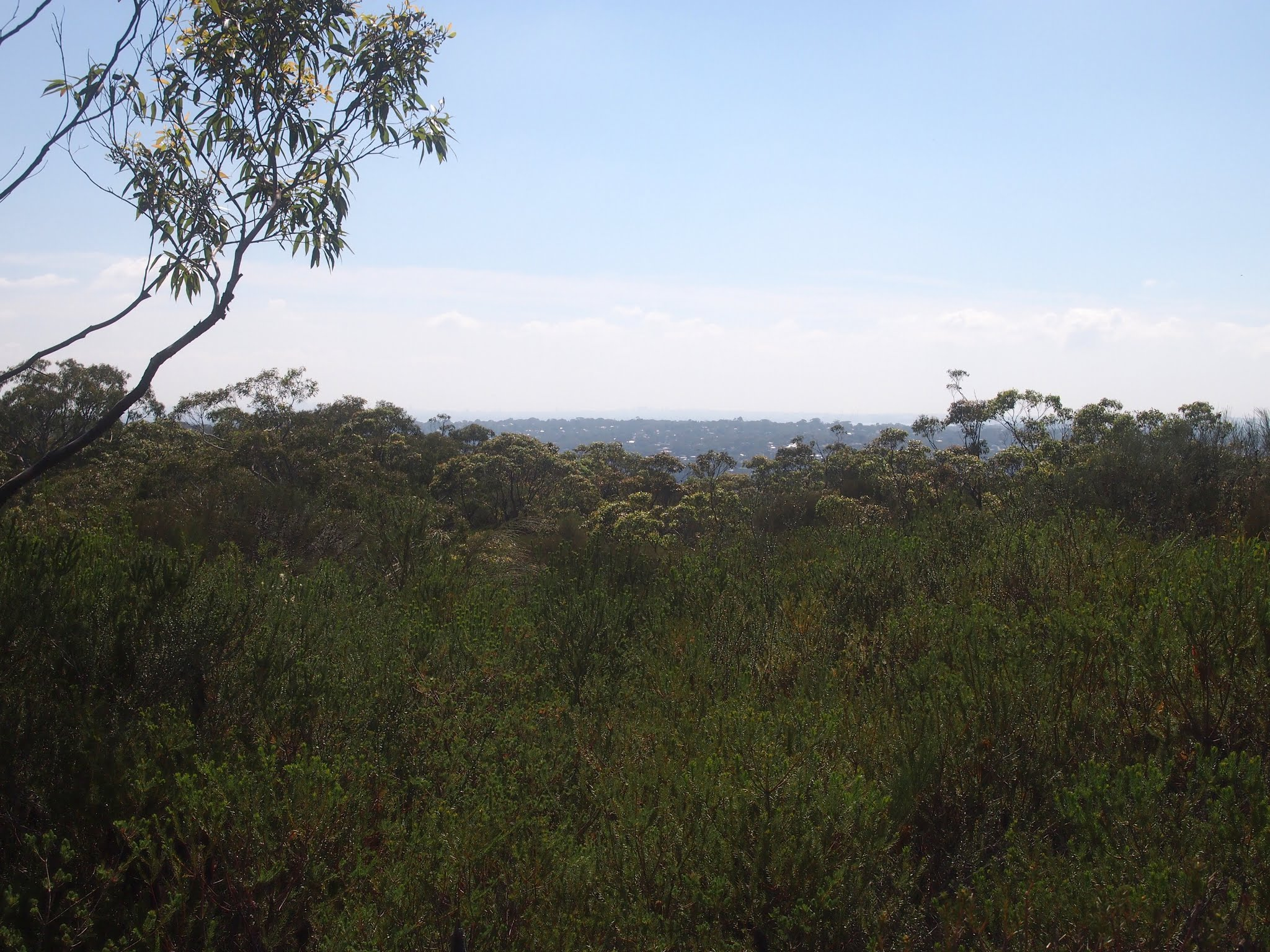
Anice Falls Track (#7)

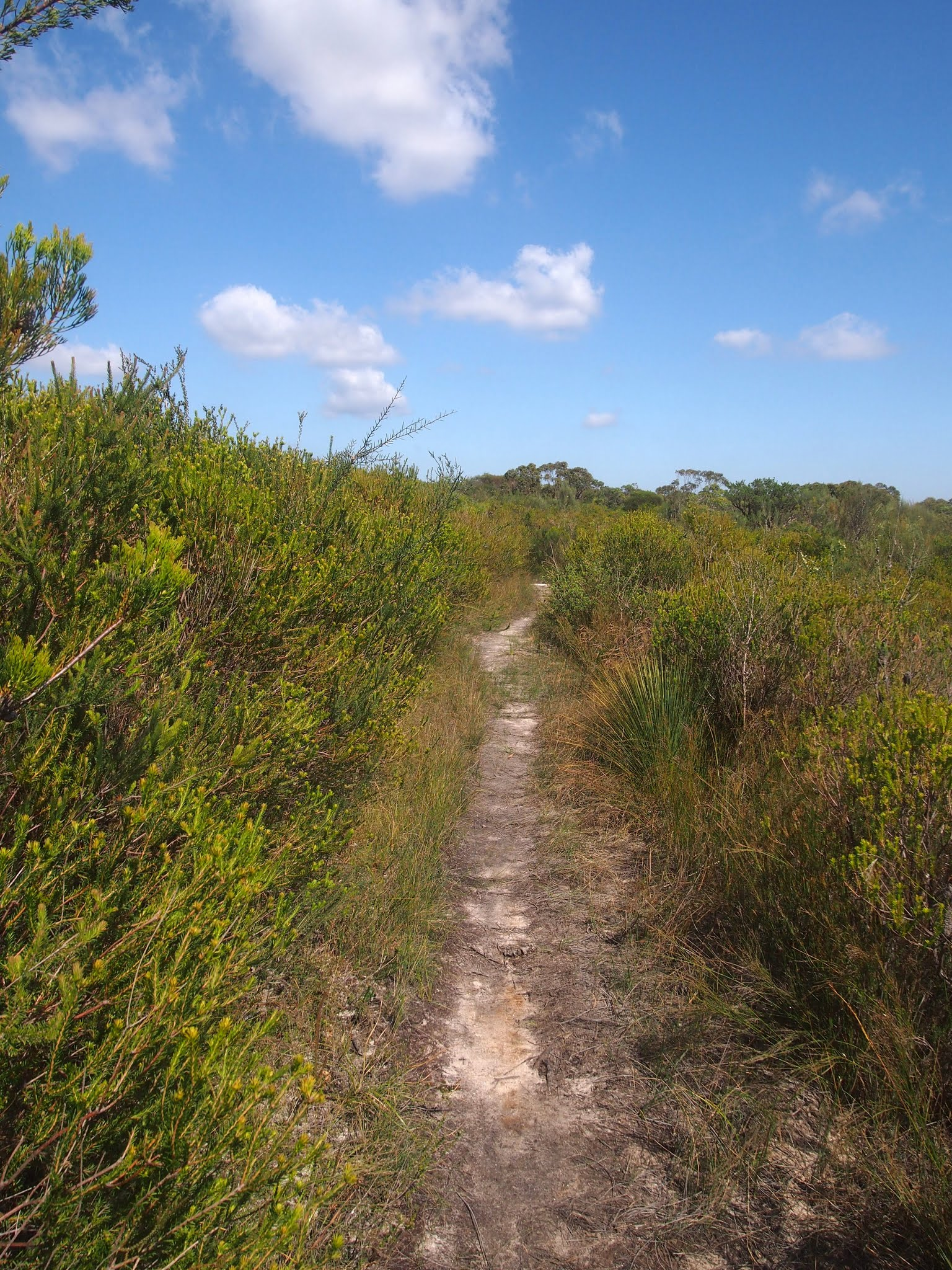
Anice Falls Track (#8)

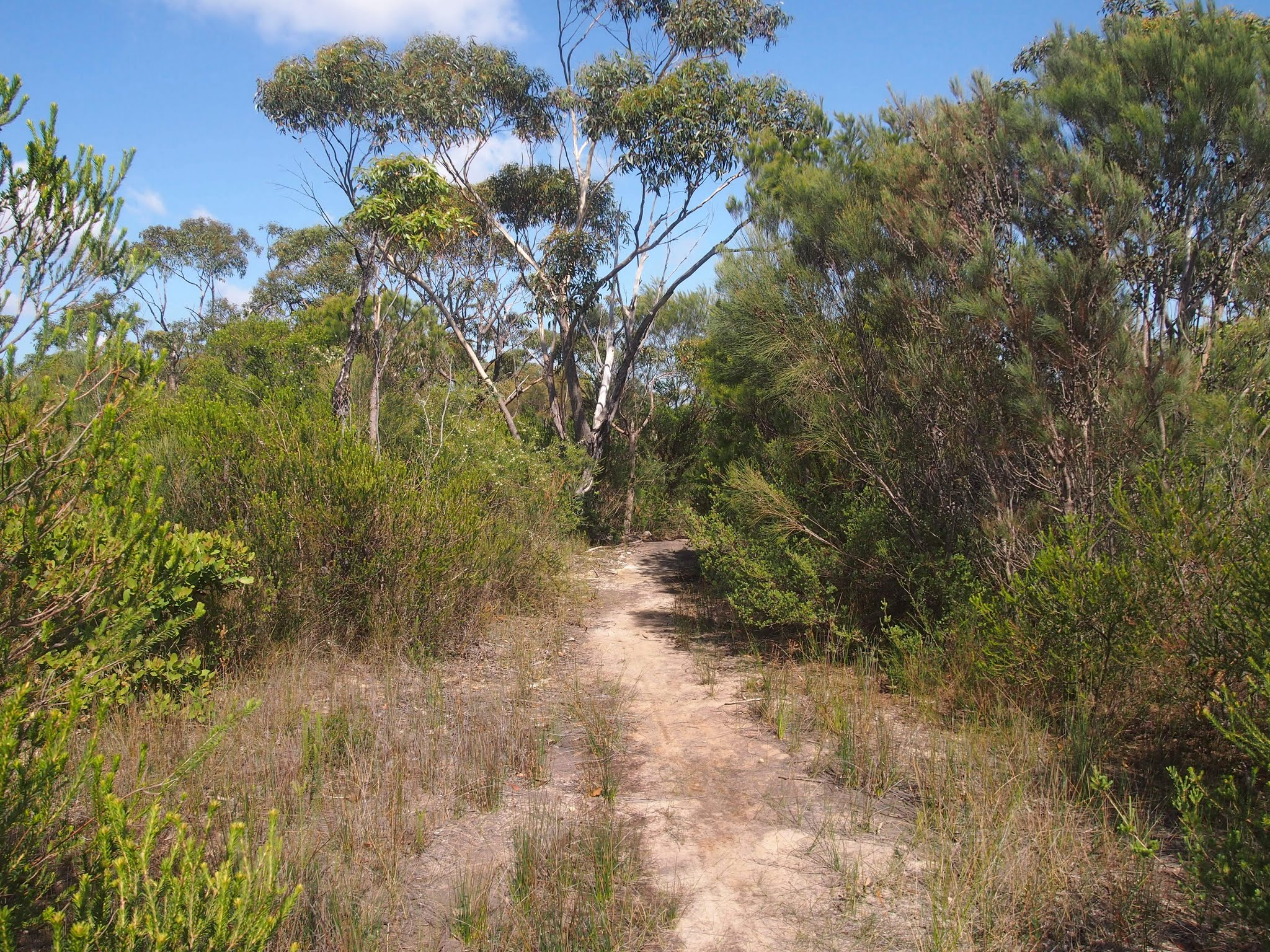
Anice Falls Track (#9)

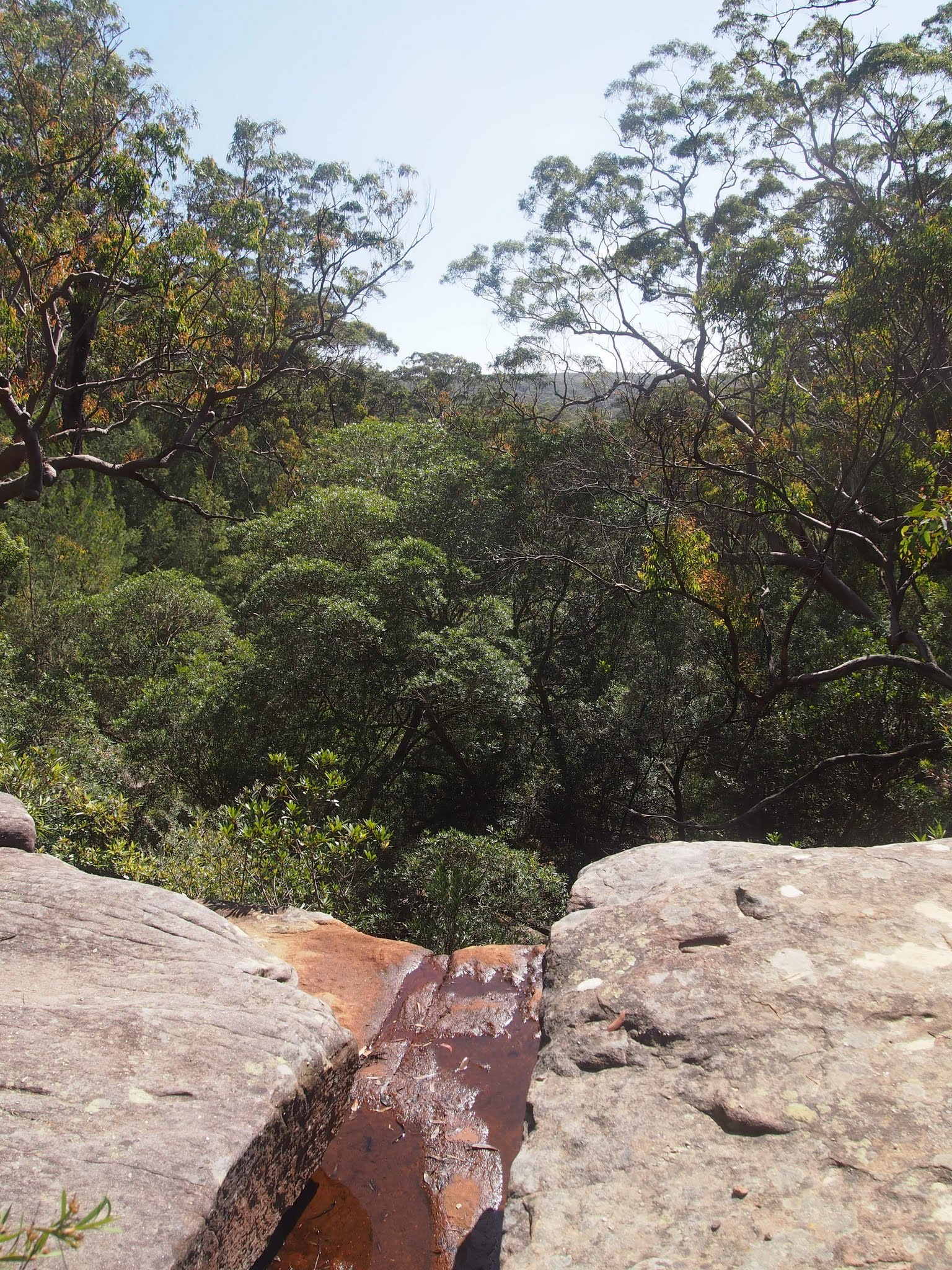
Anice Falls (#1)

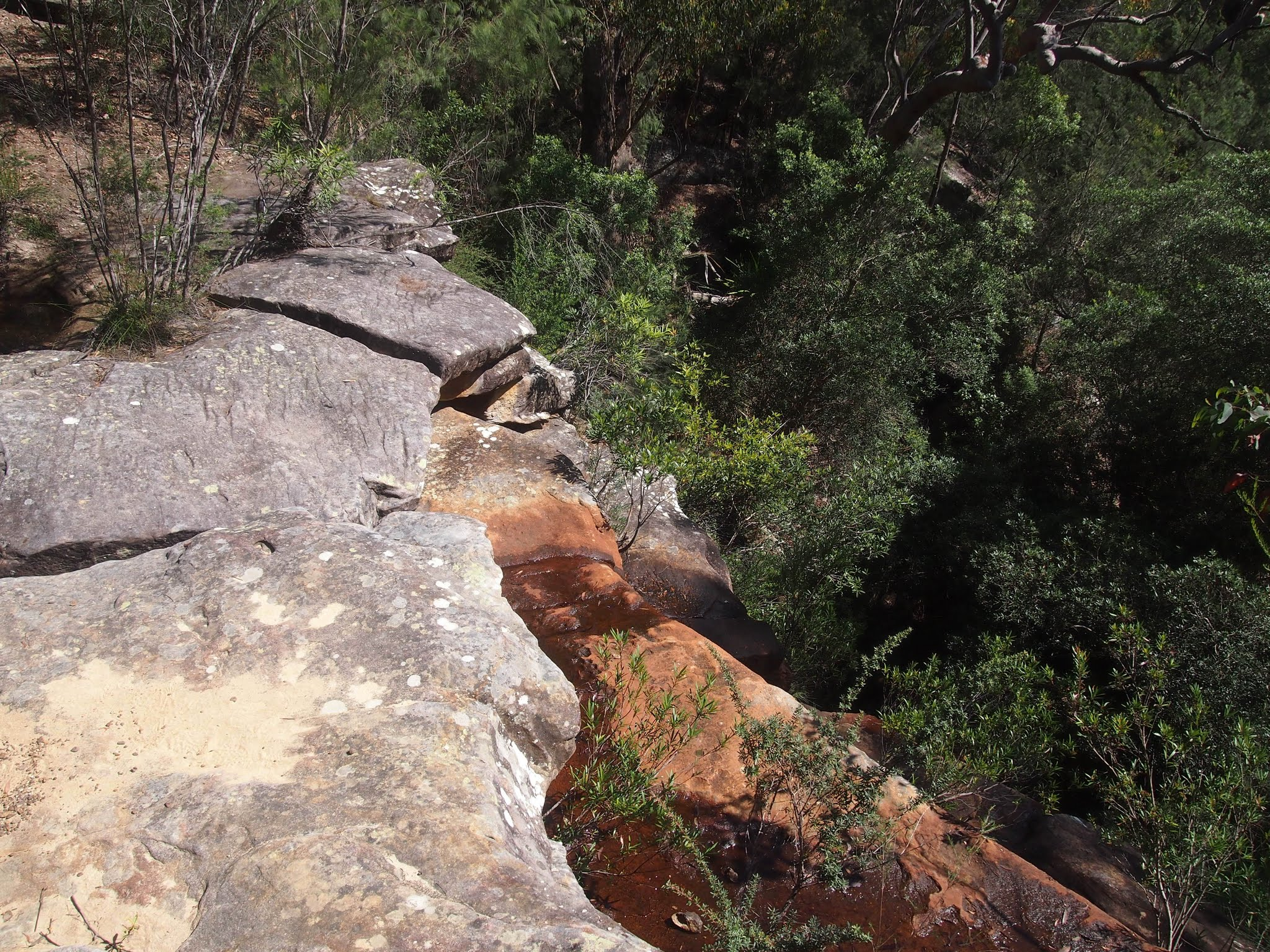
Anice Falls (#2)

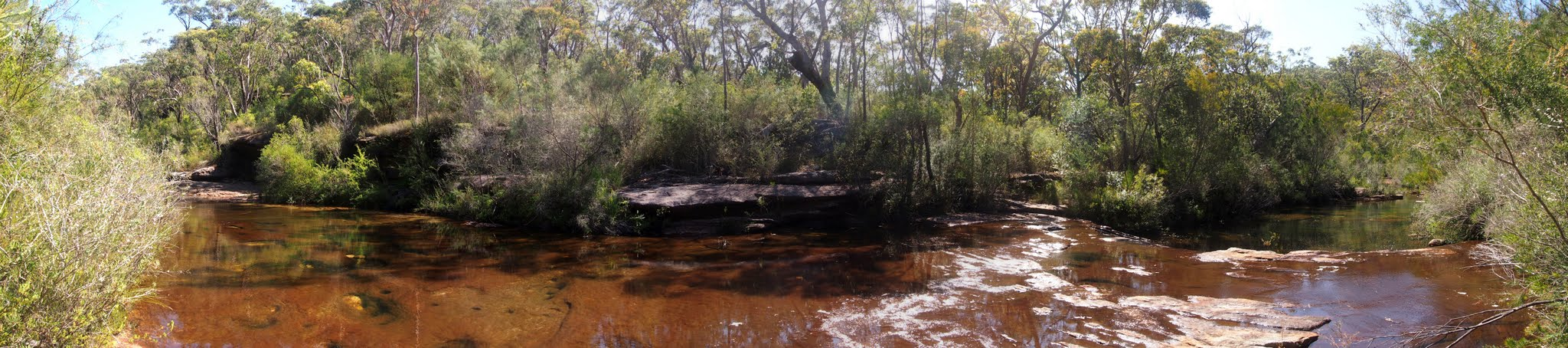
Winifred Falls Track (#1)

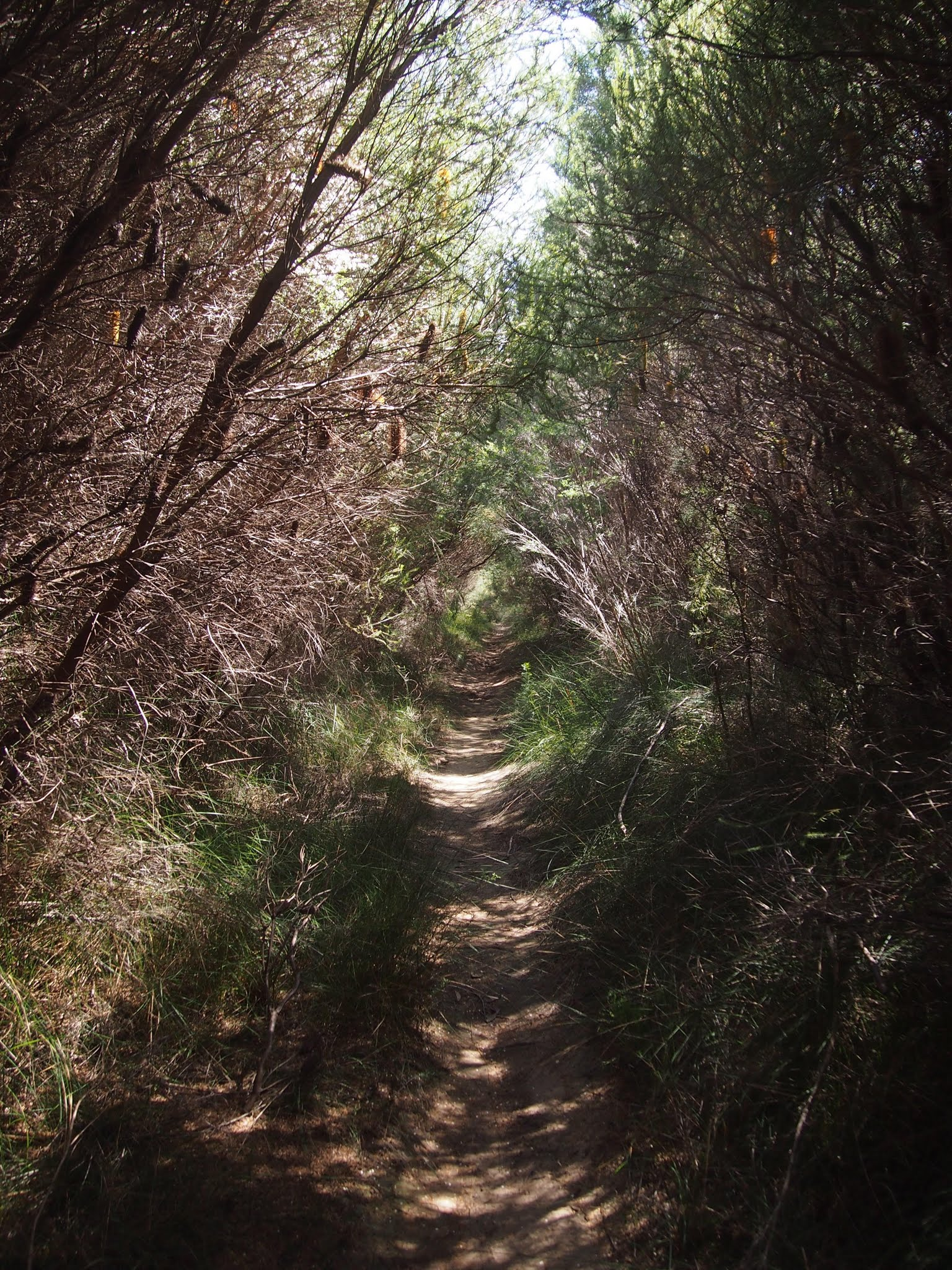
Winifred Falls Track (#2)

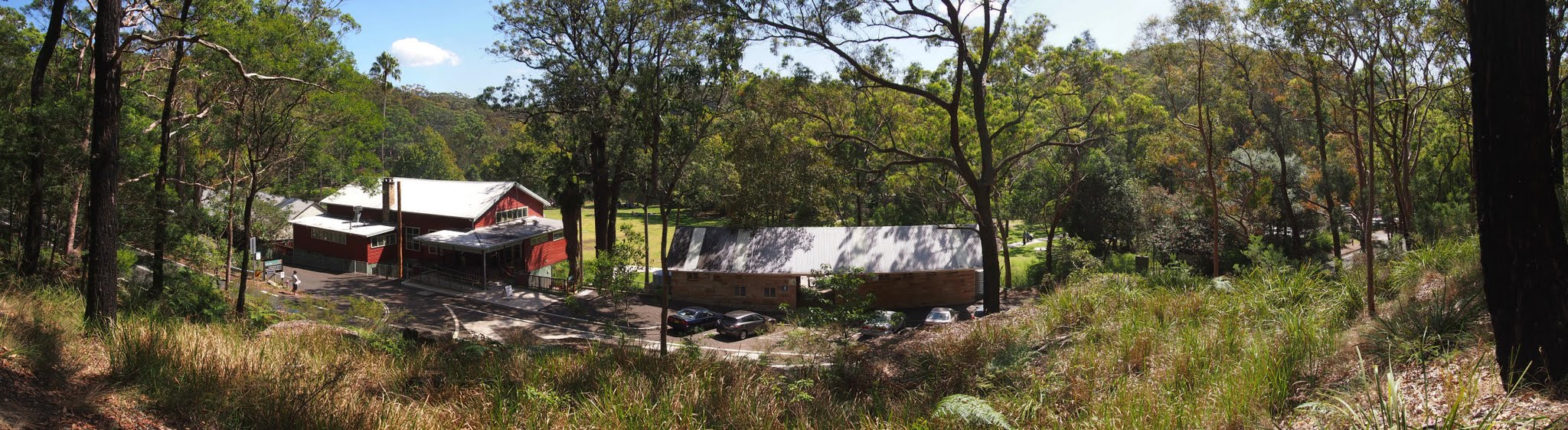
Winifred Falls Track (#3)

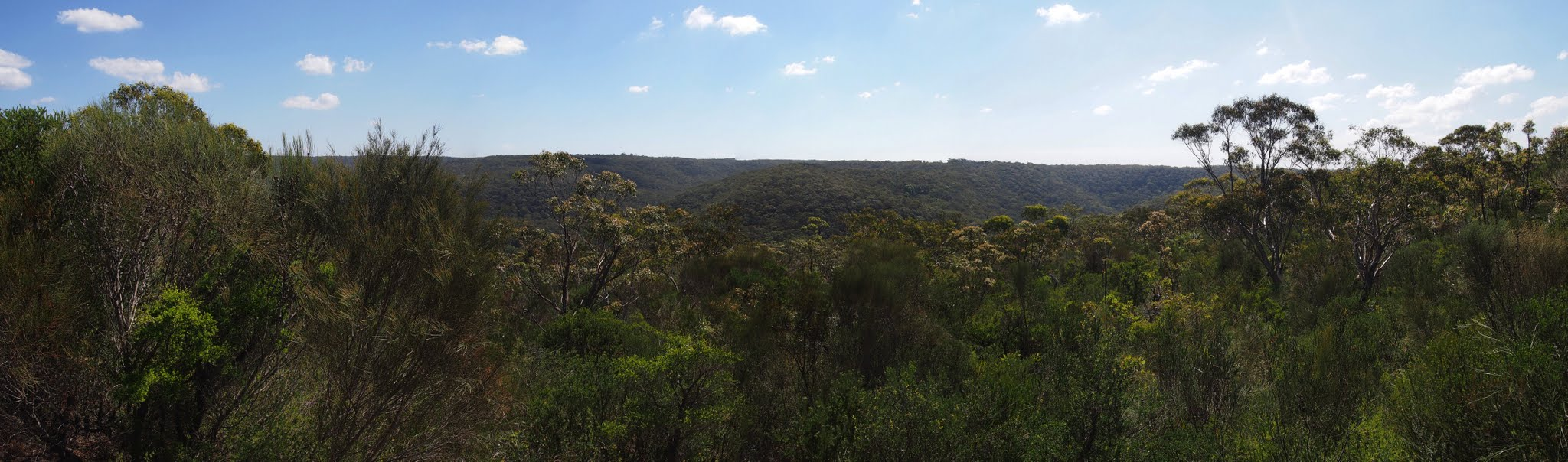
Winifred Falls Track (#4)

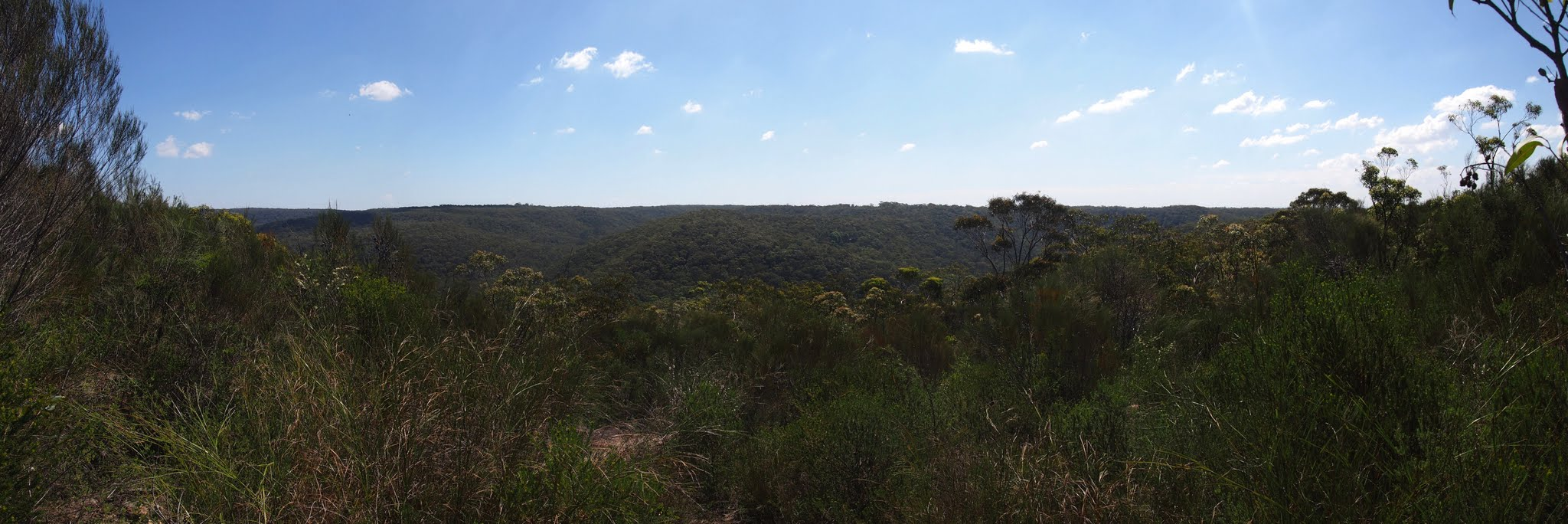
Winifred Falls Track (#5)

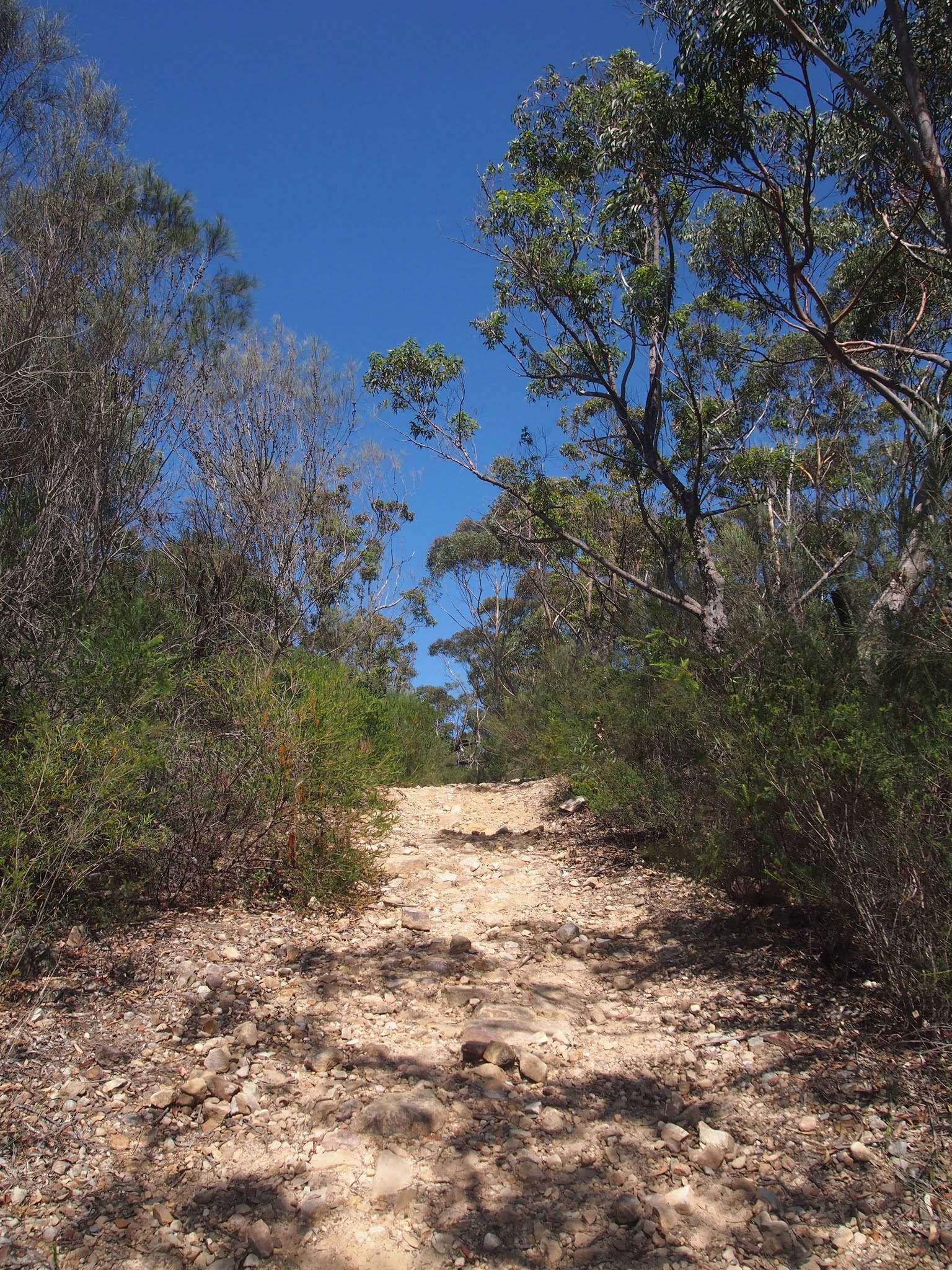
Winifred Falls Track (#6)

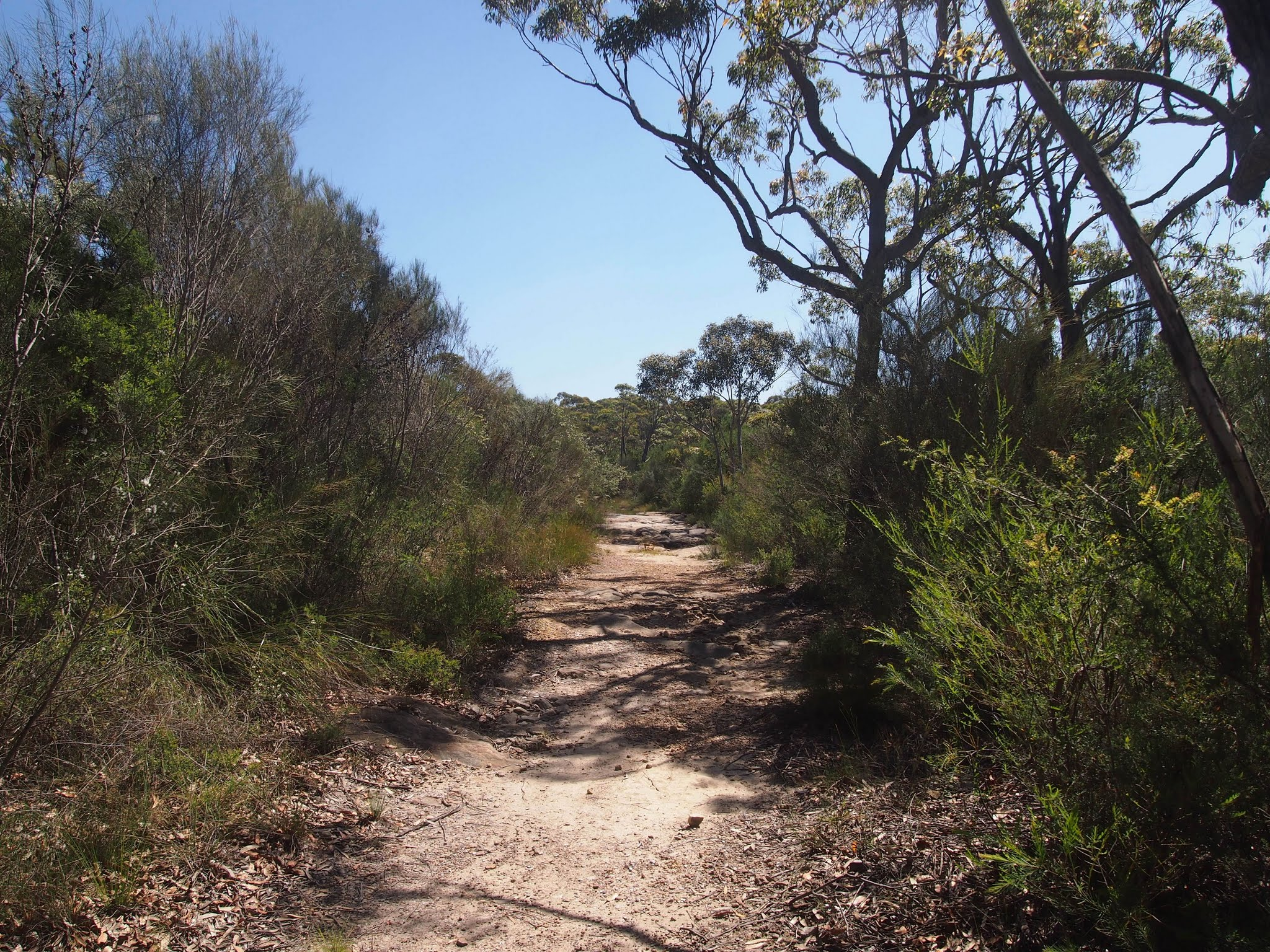
Winifred Falls Track (#7)

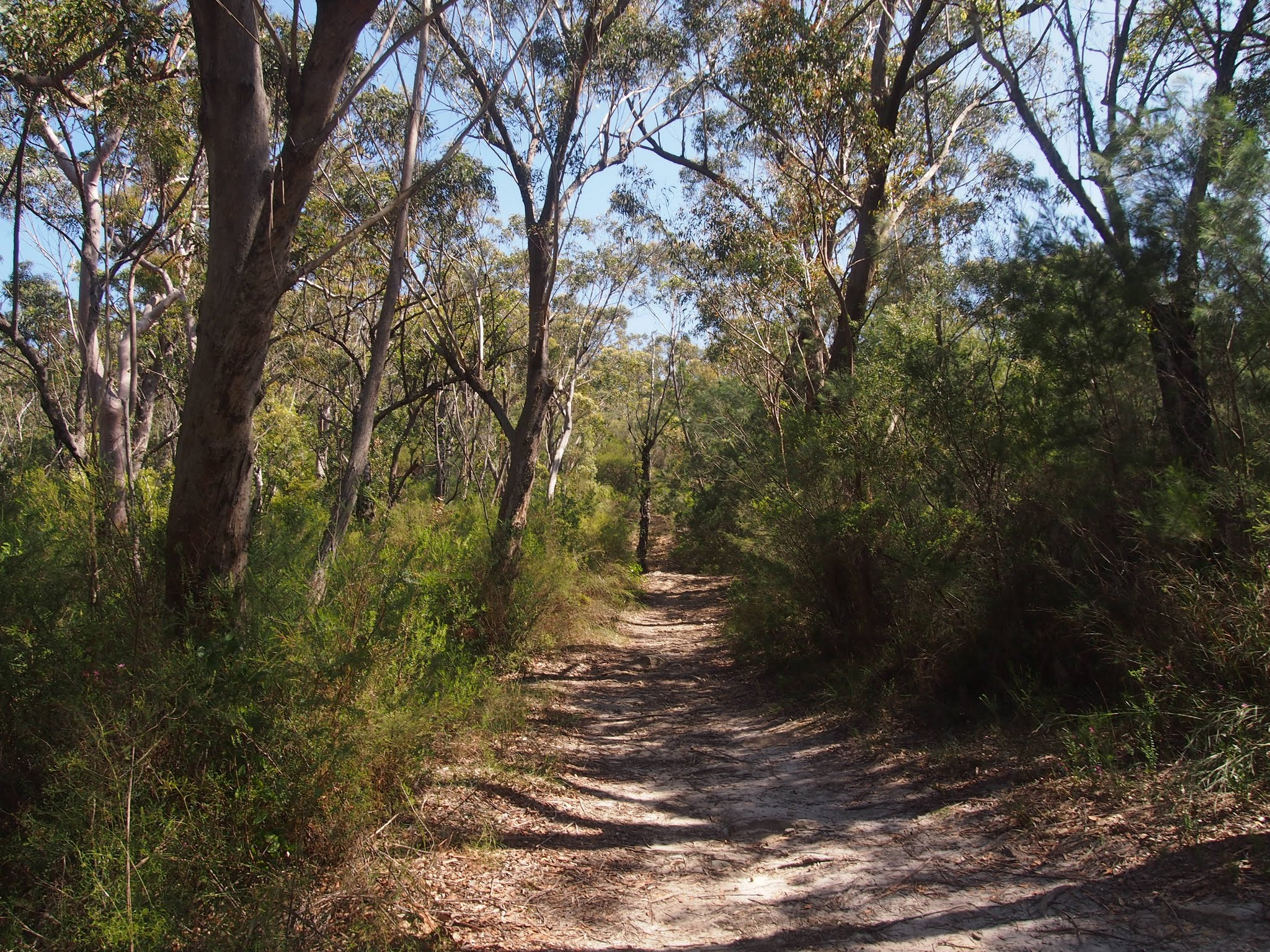
Winifred Falls Track (#8)

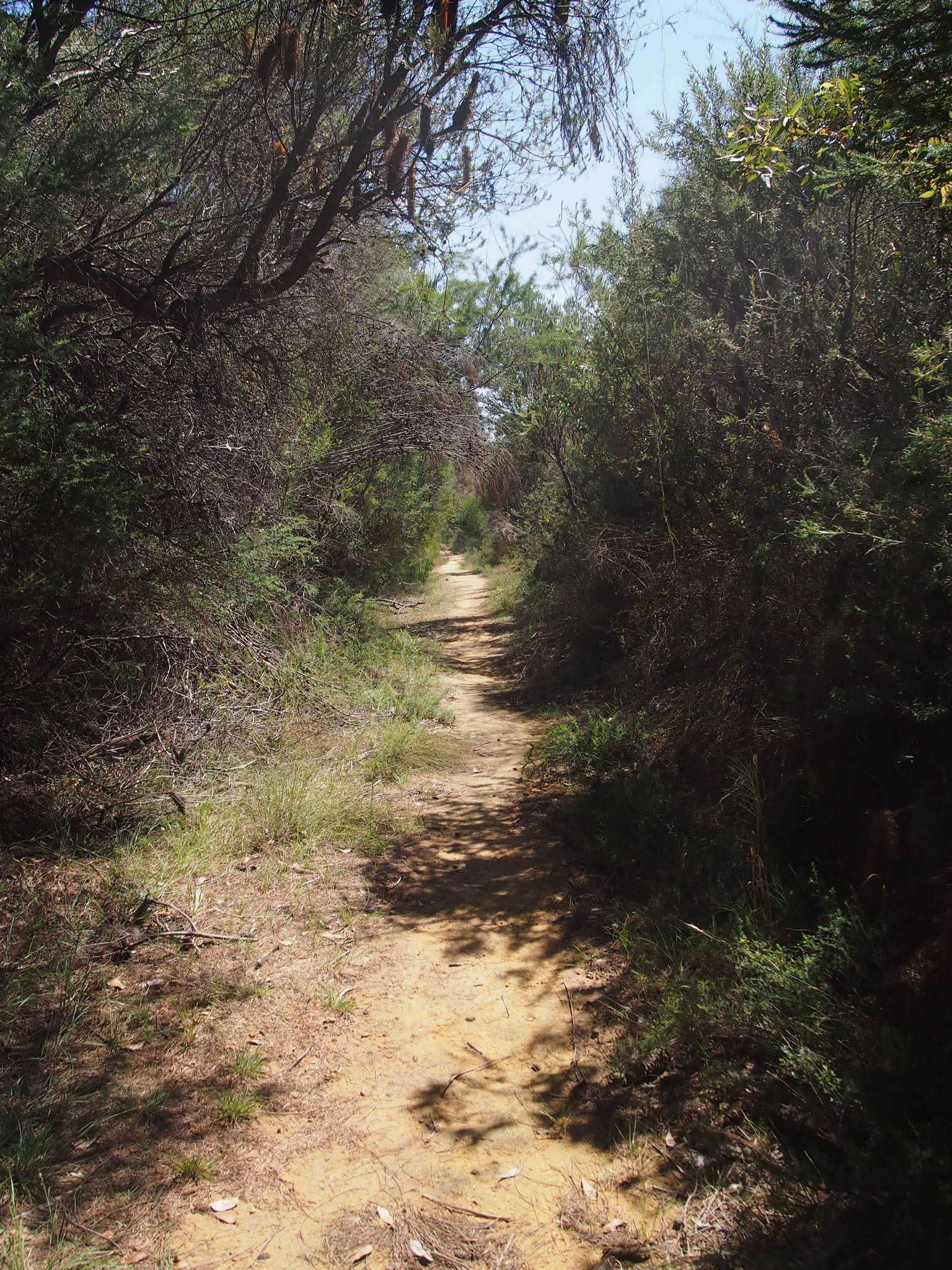
Winifred Falls Track (#9)

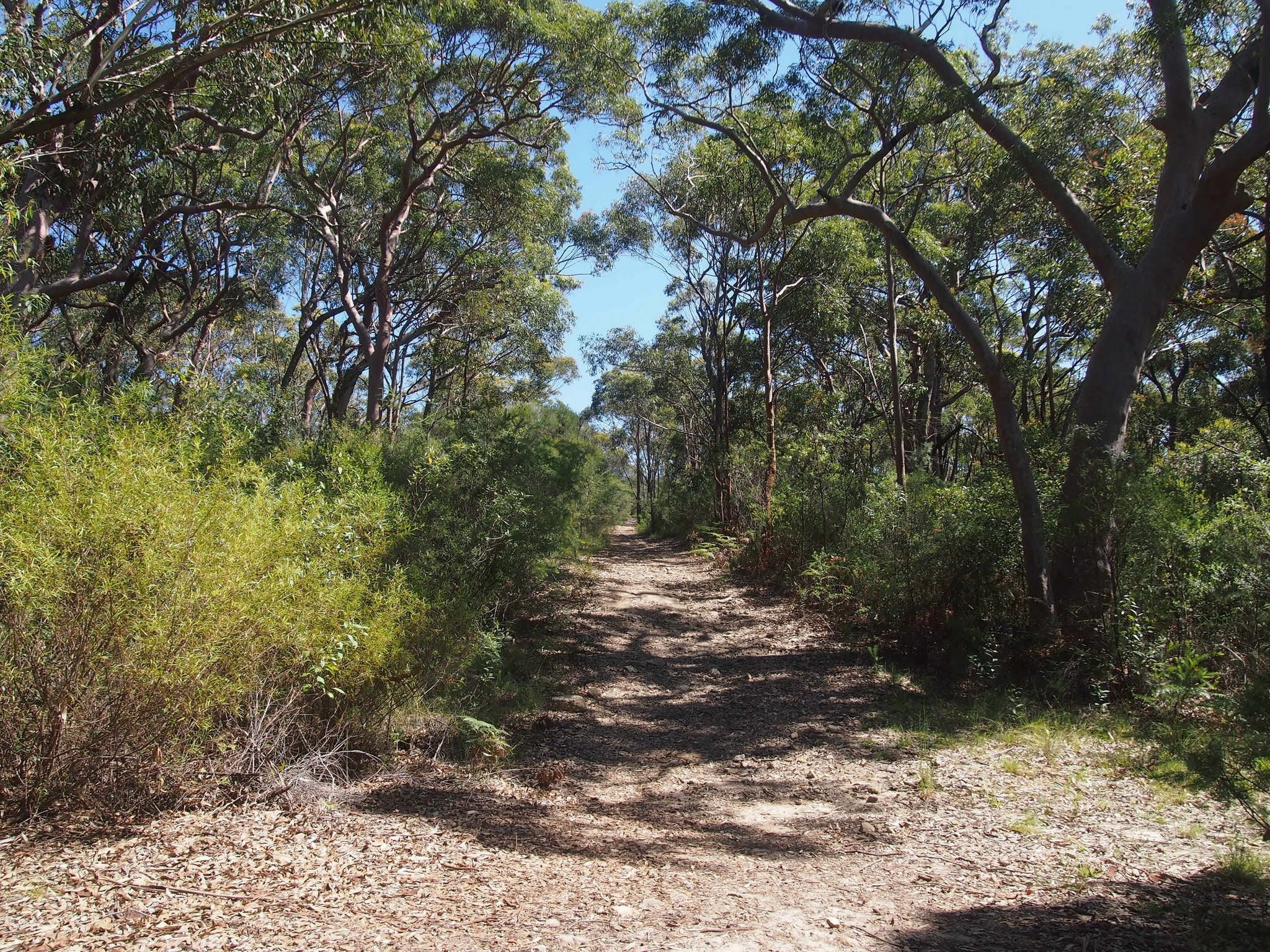
Winifred Falls Track (#10)

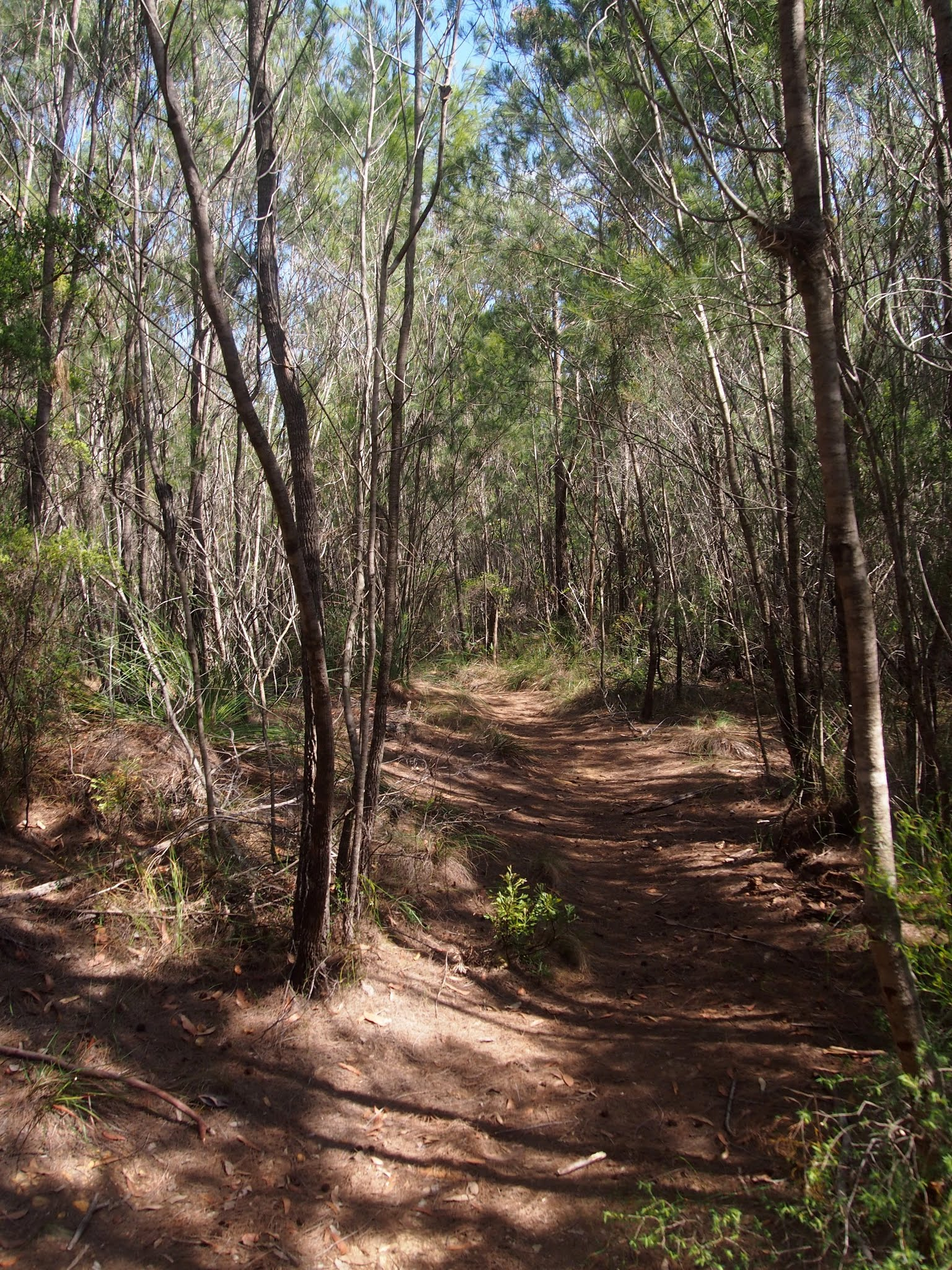
Winifred Falls Track (#11)

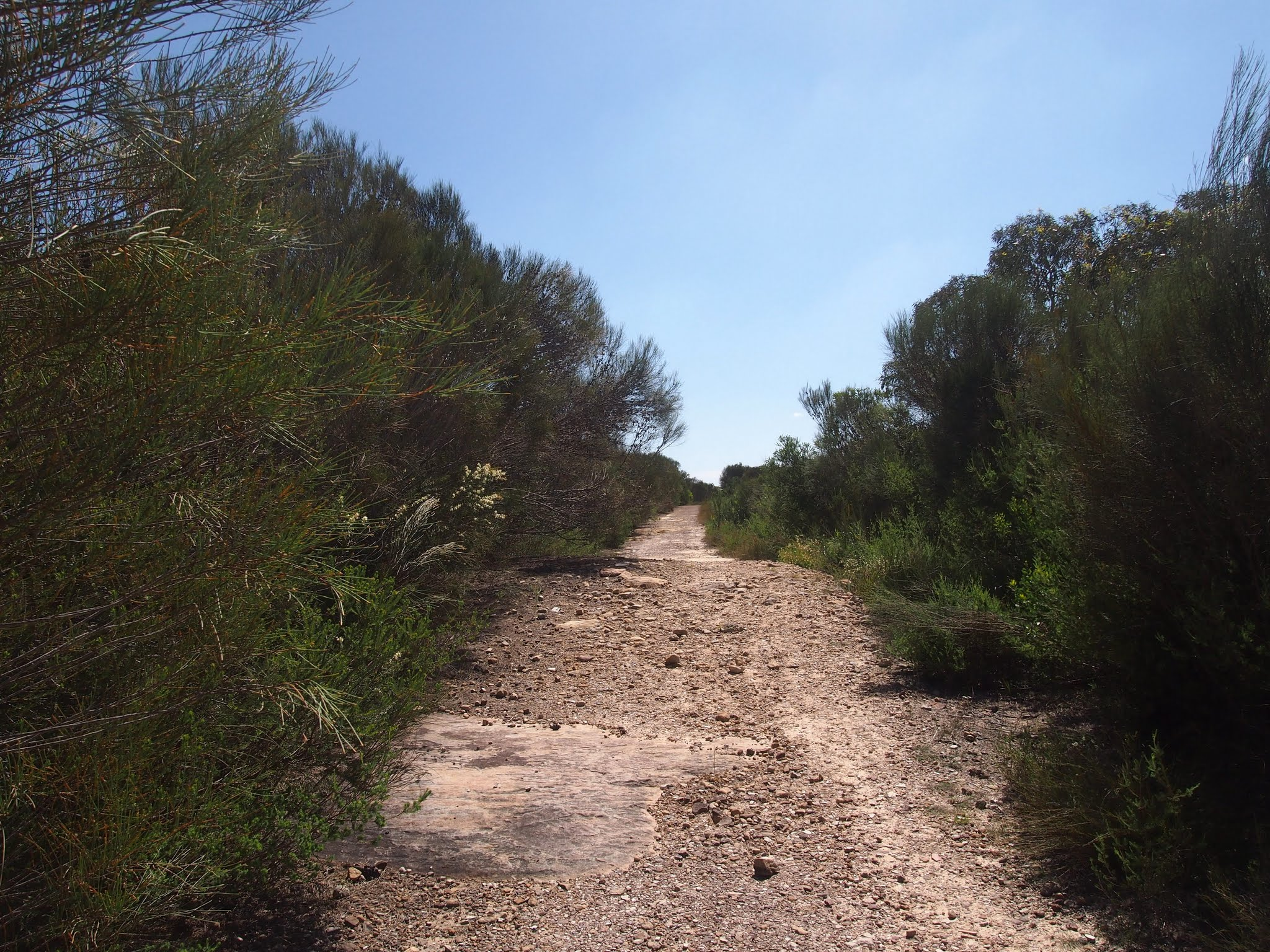
Winifred Falls Track (#12)

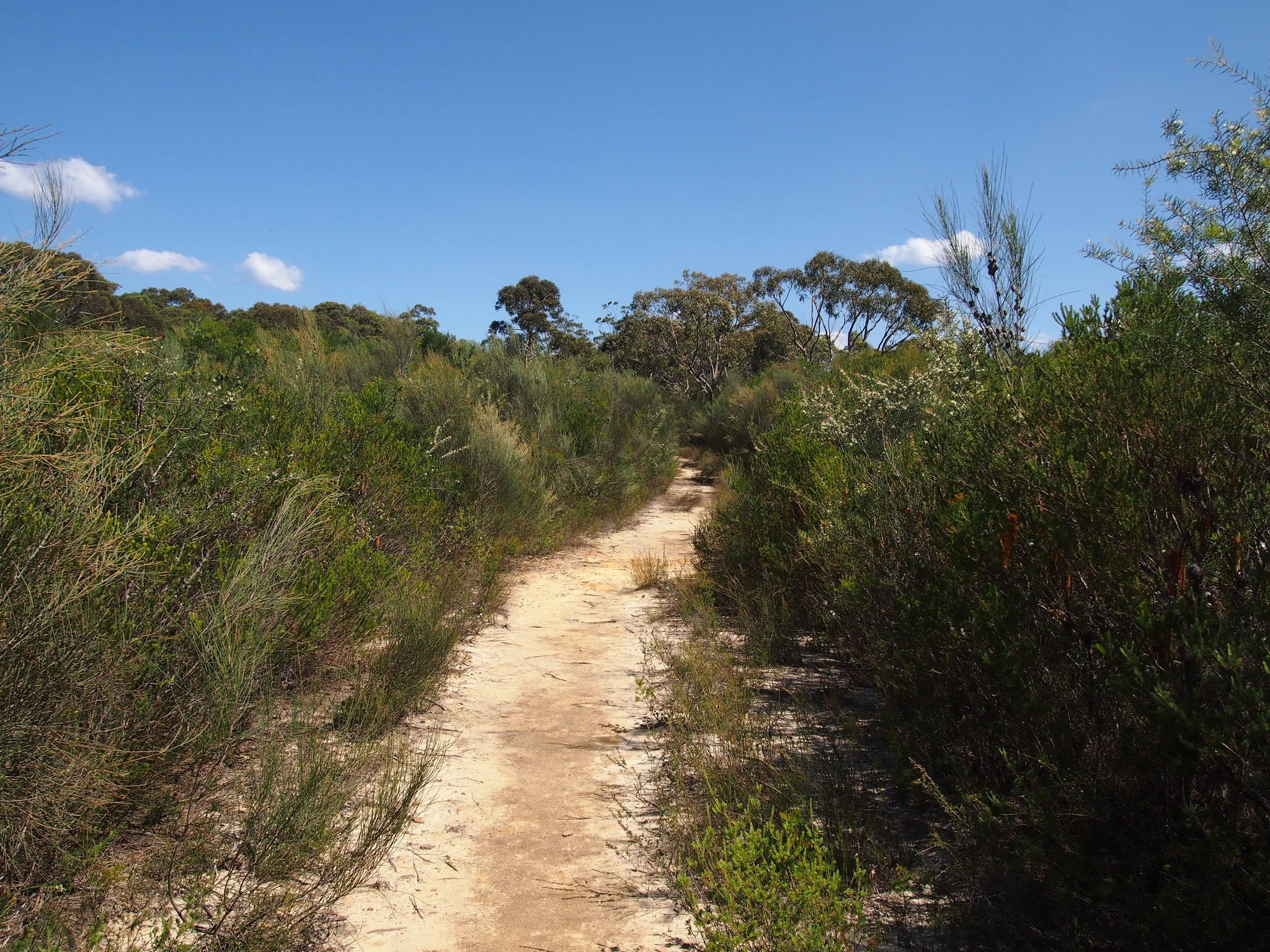
Winifred Falls Track (#13)

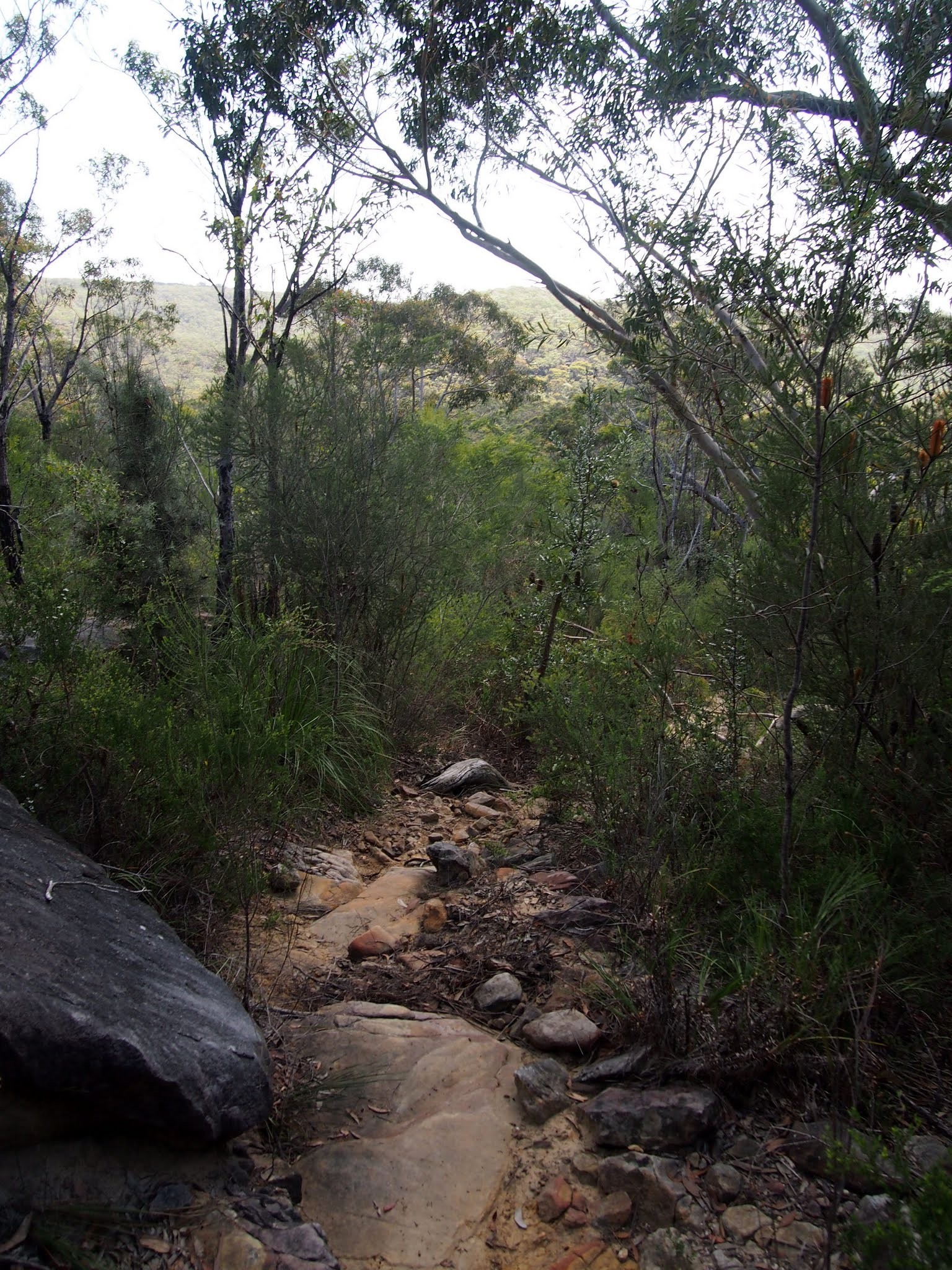
Winifred Falls Track (#14)

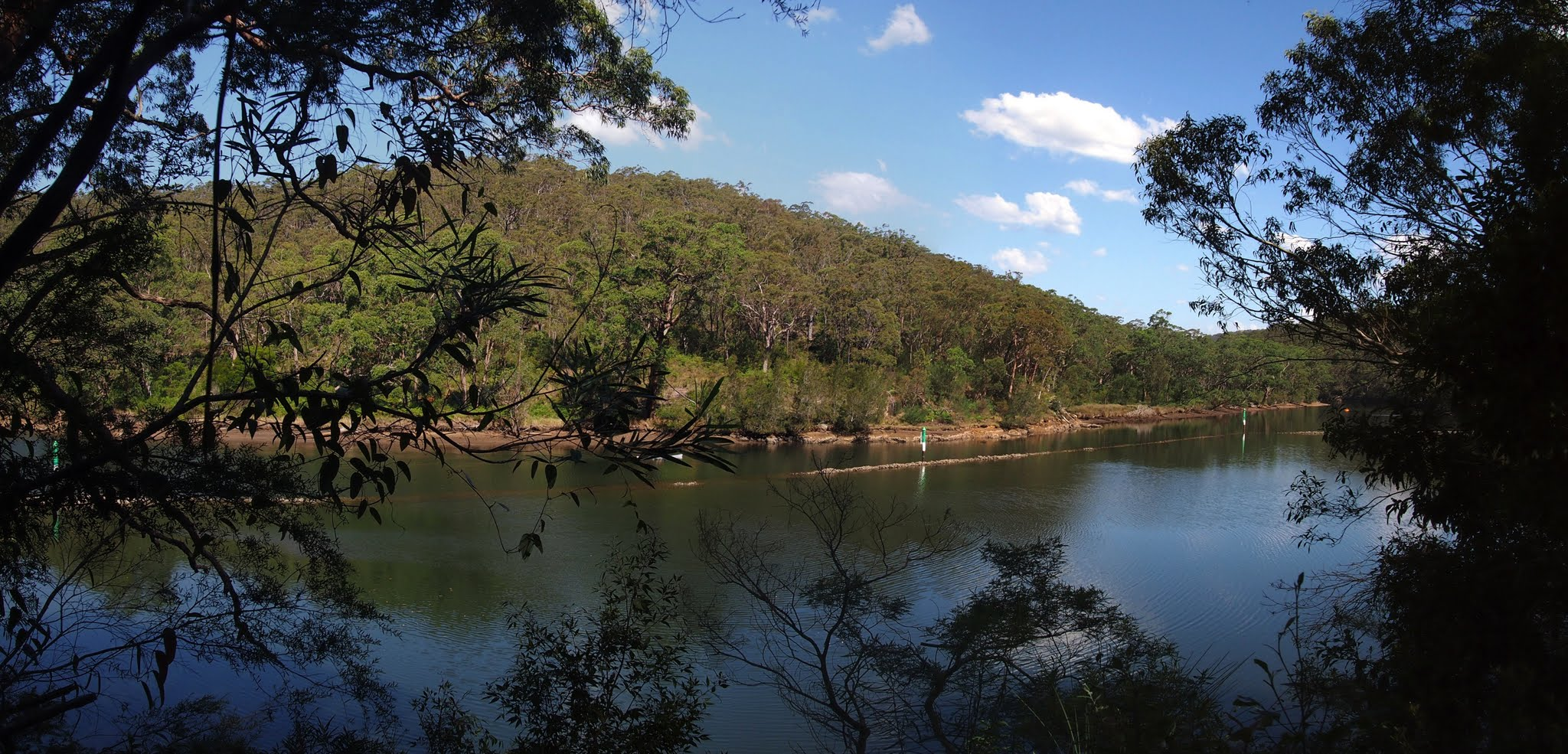
Riverside Drive (#1)

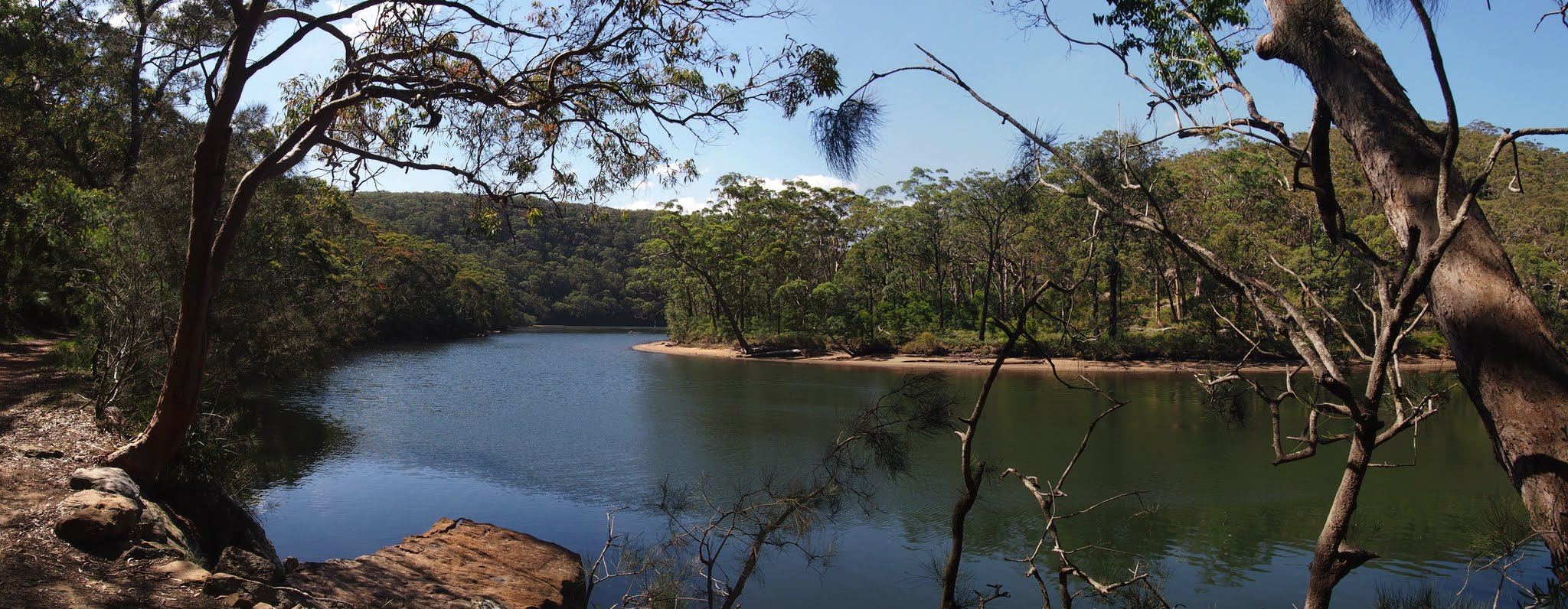
Riverside Drive (#2)

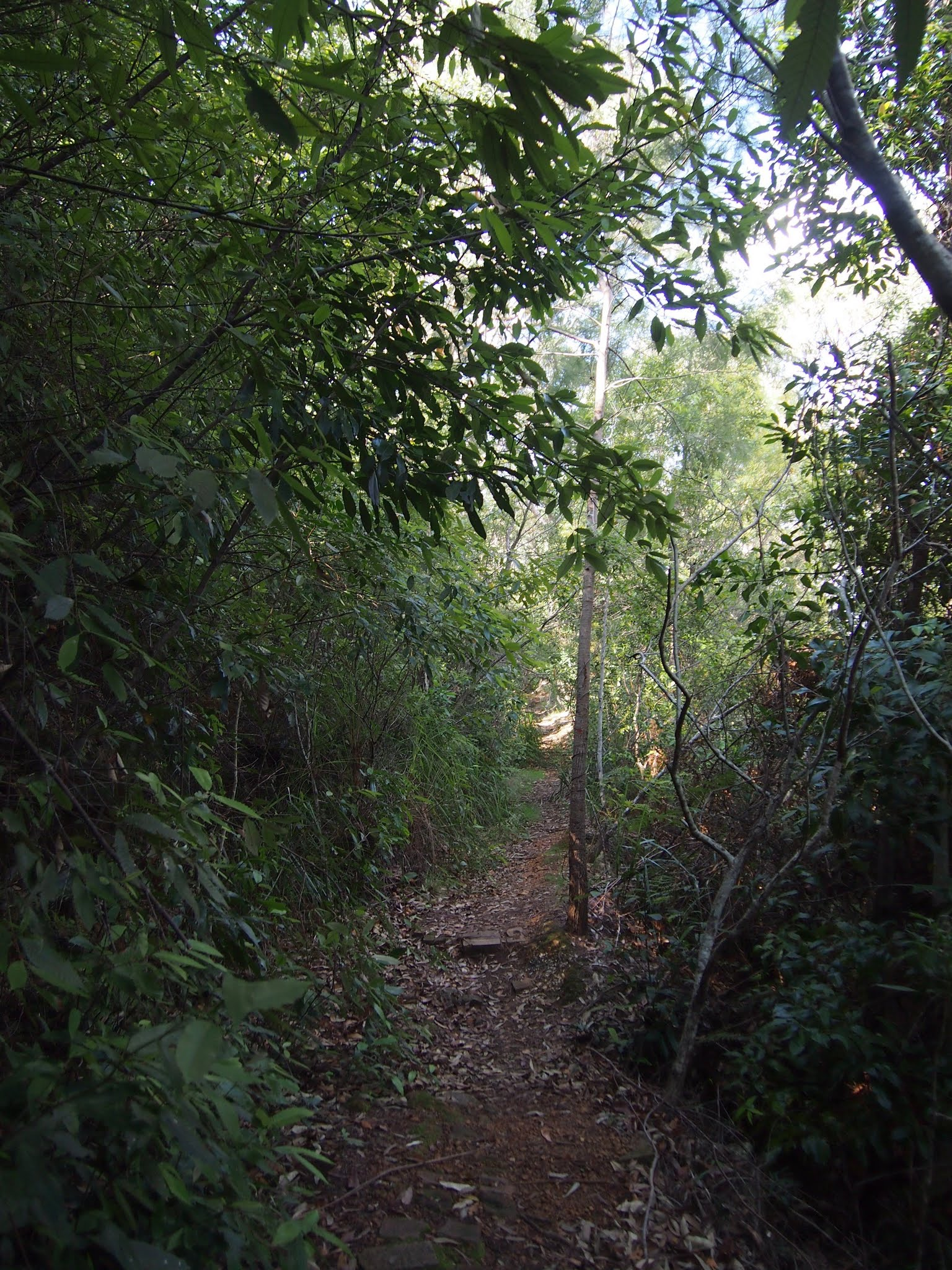
Riverside Drive (#3)

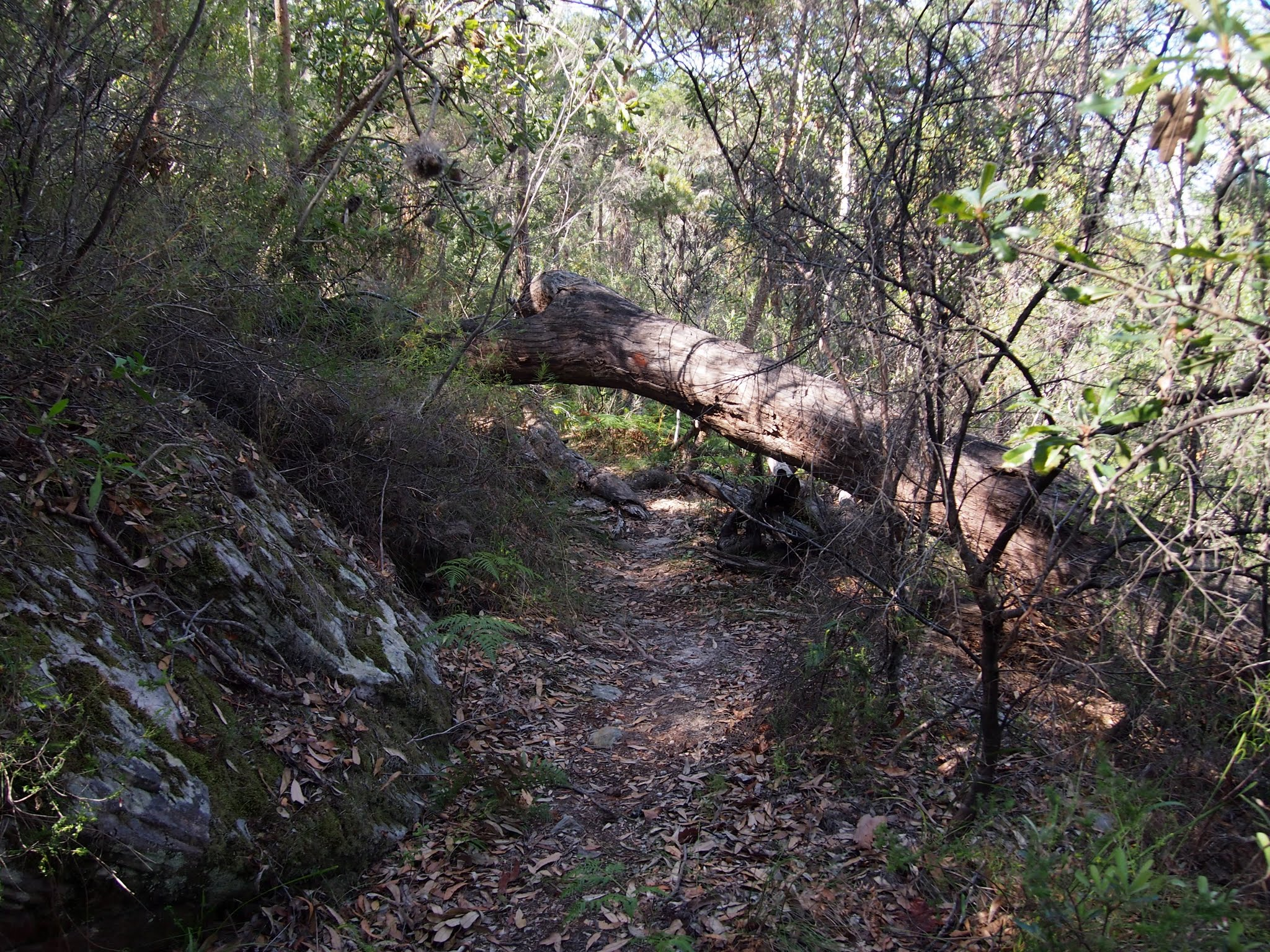
Riverside Drive (#4)

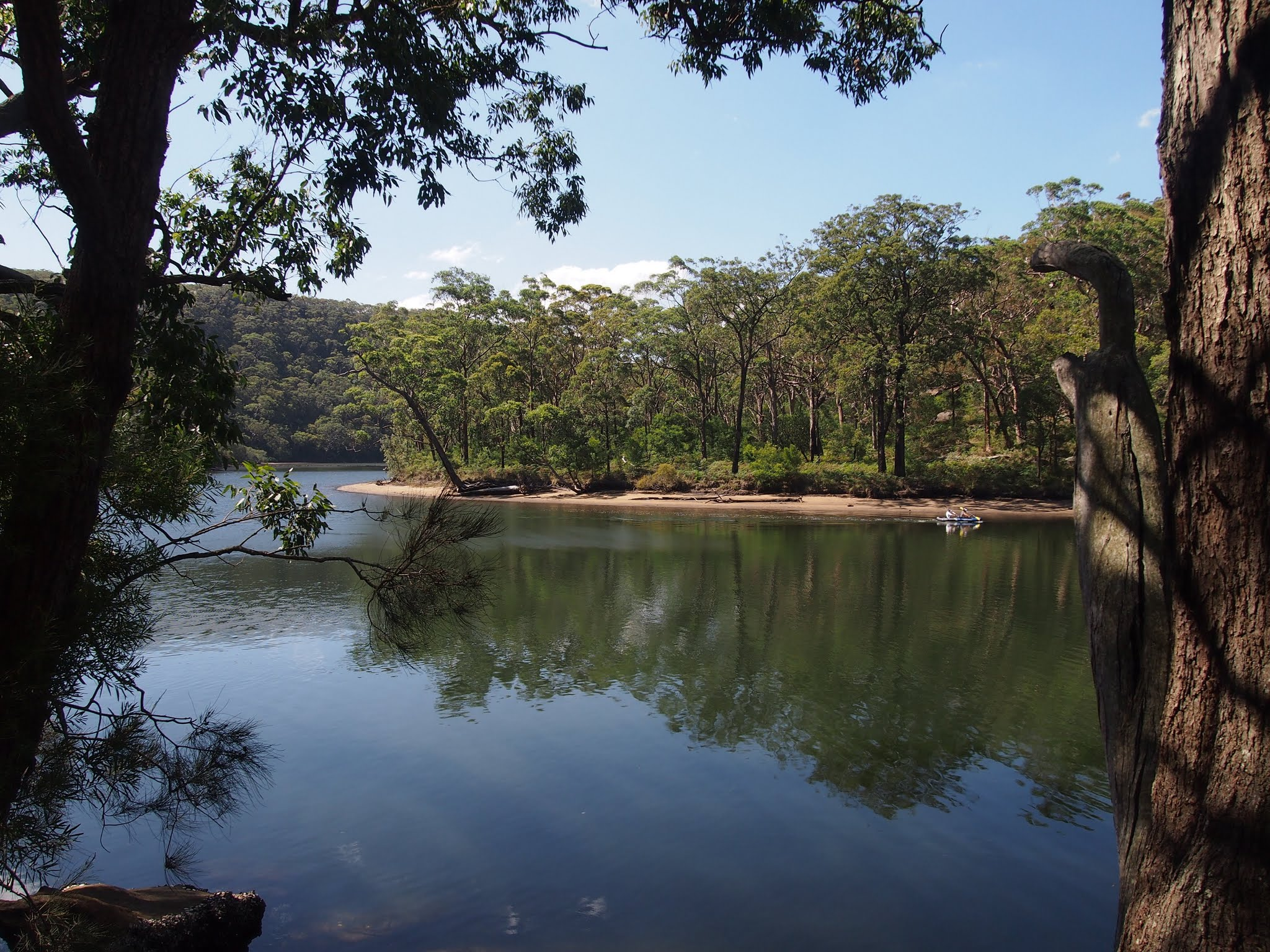
Riverside Drive (#5)

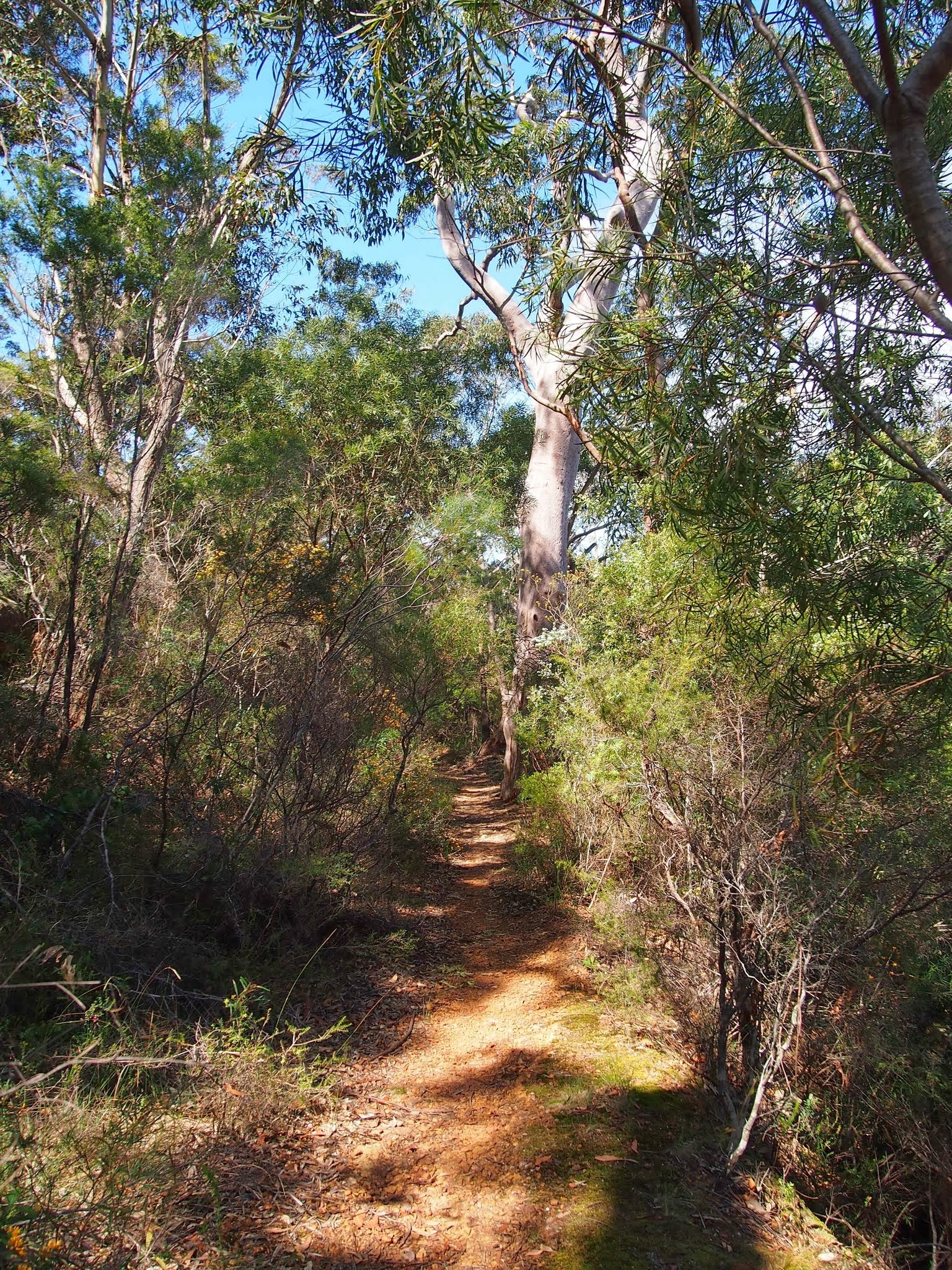
Riverside Drive (#6)

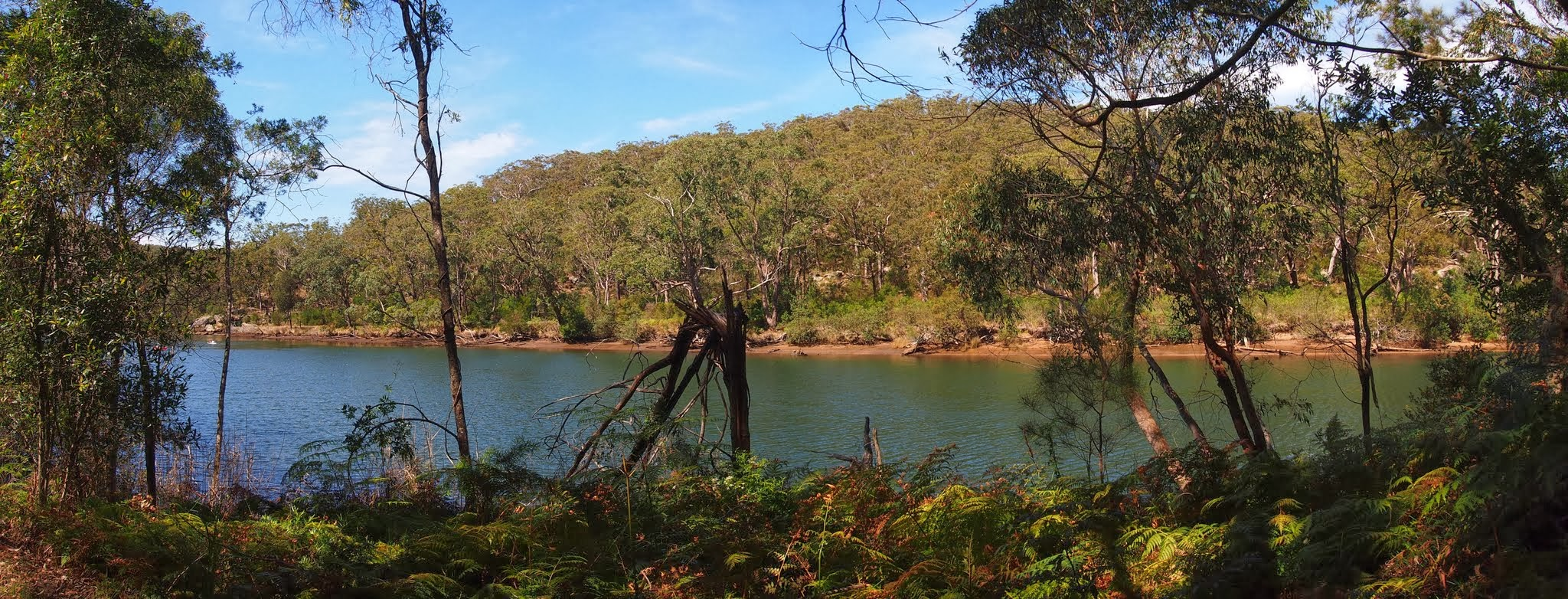
Riverside Drive (#7)

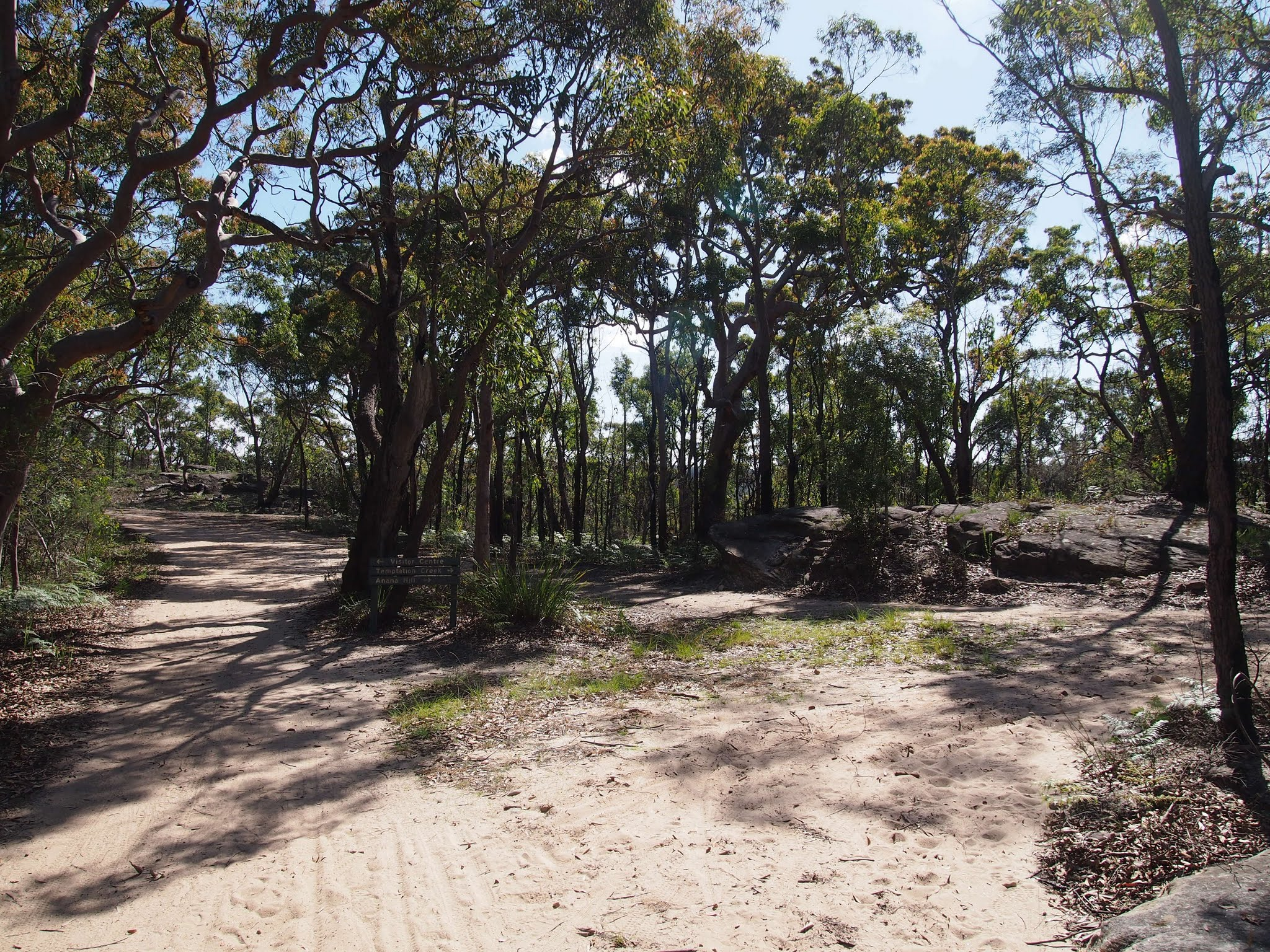
Florence Parade Trail

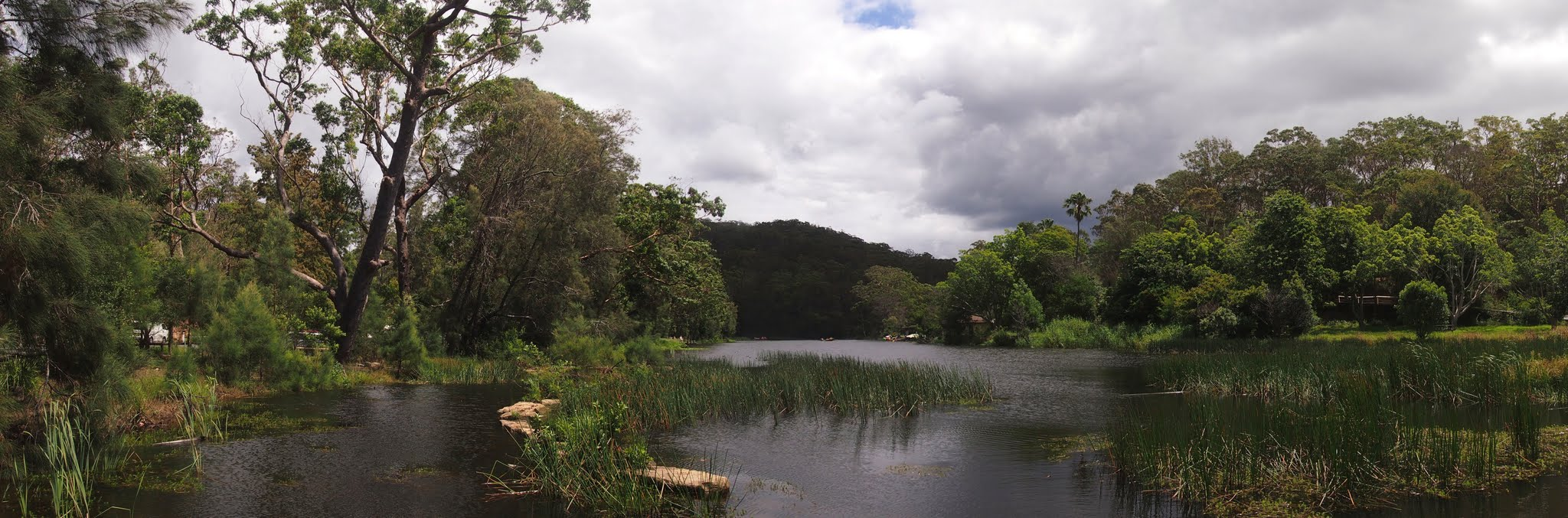
Audley Weir (#1)

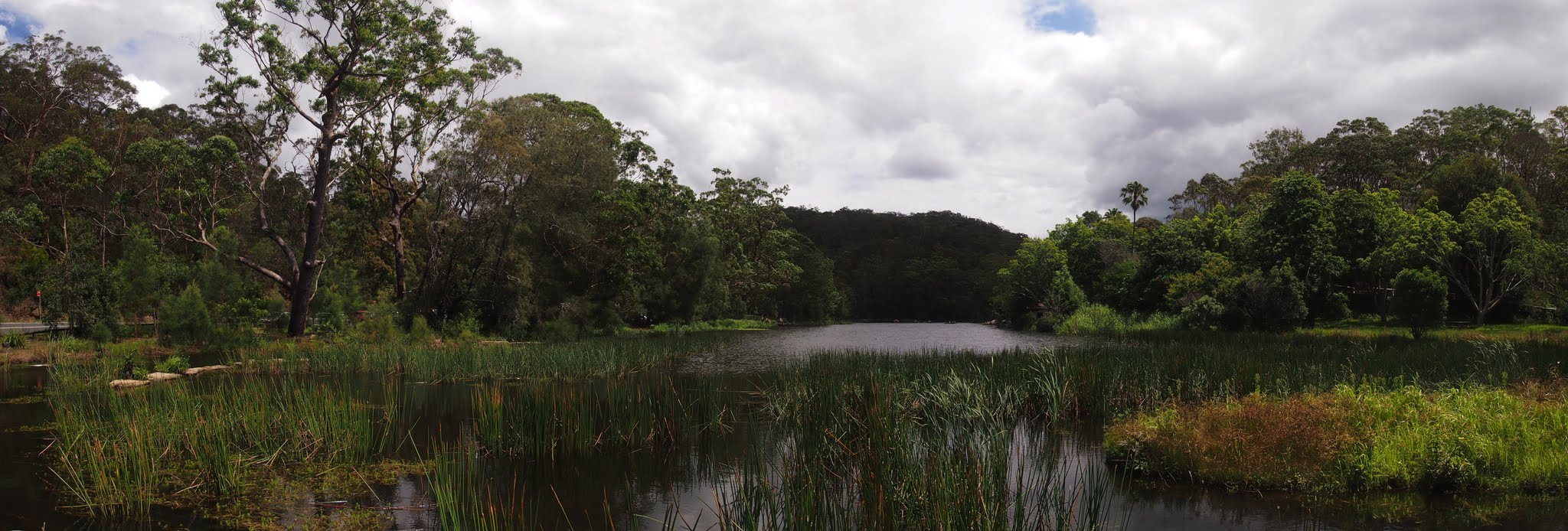
Audley Weir (#2)

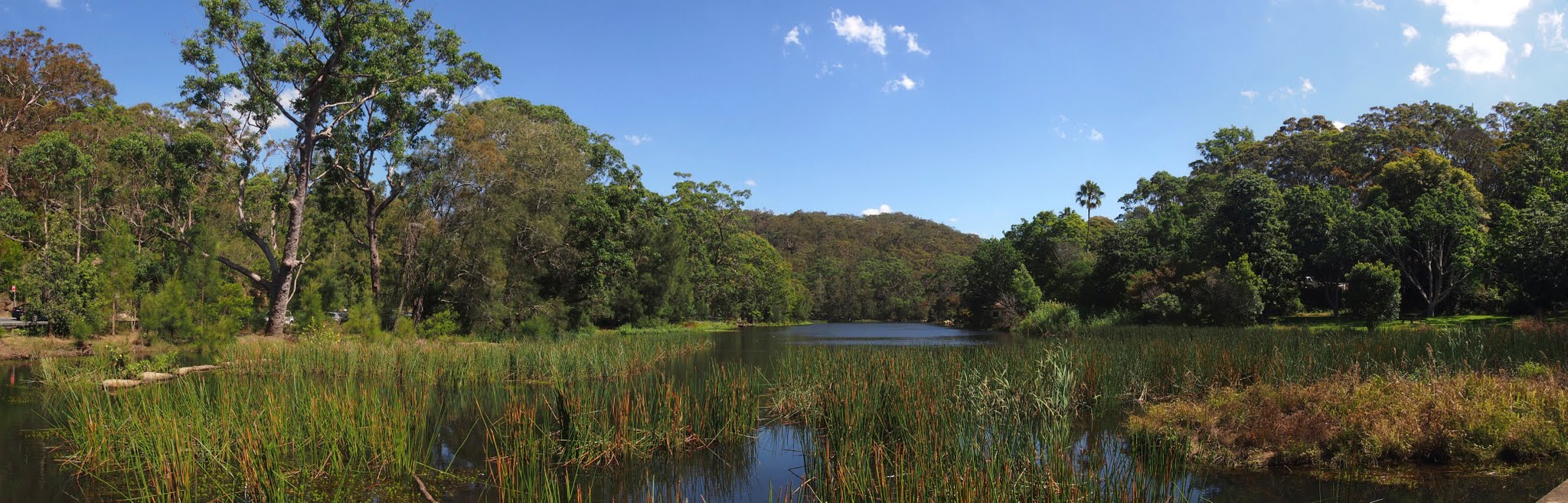
Audley Weir (#3)

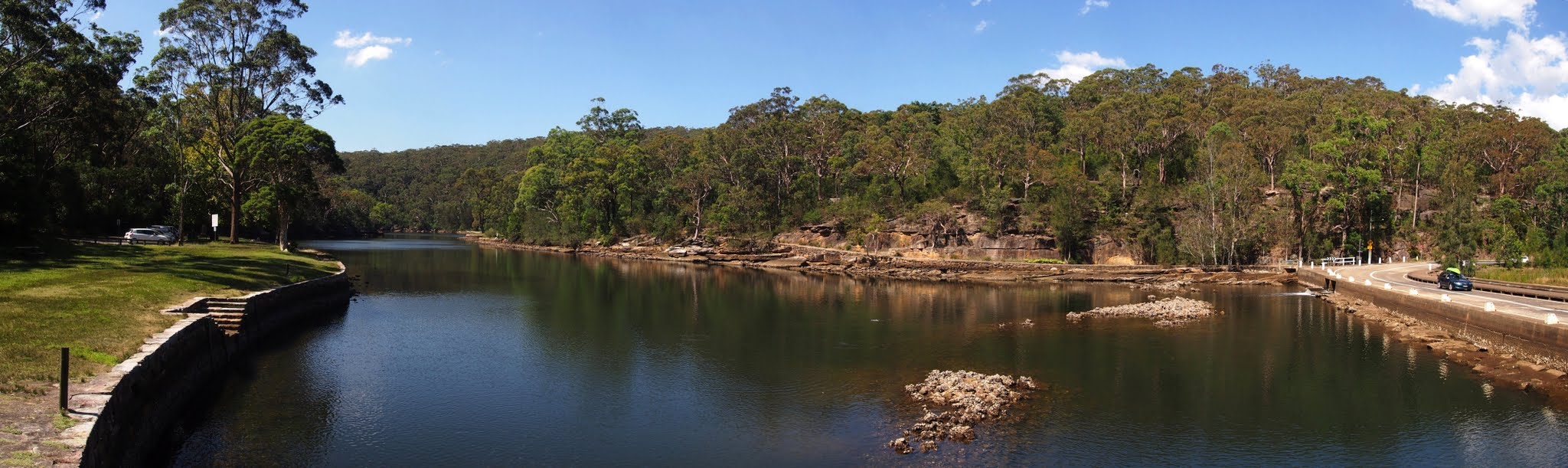
Audley Weir (#4)

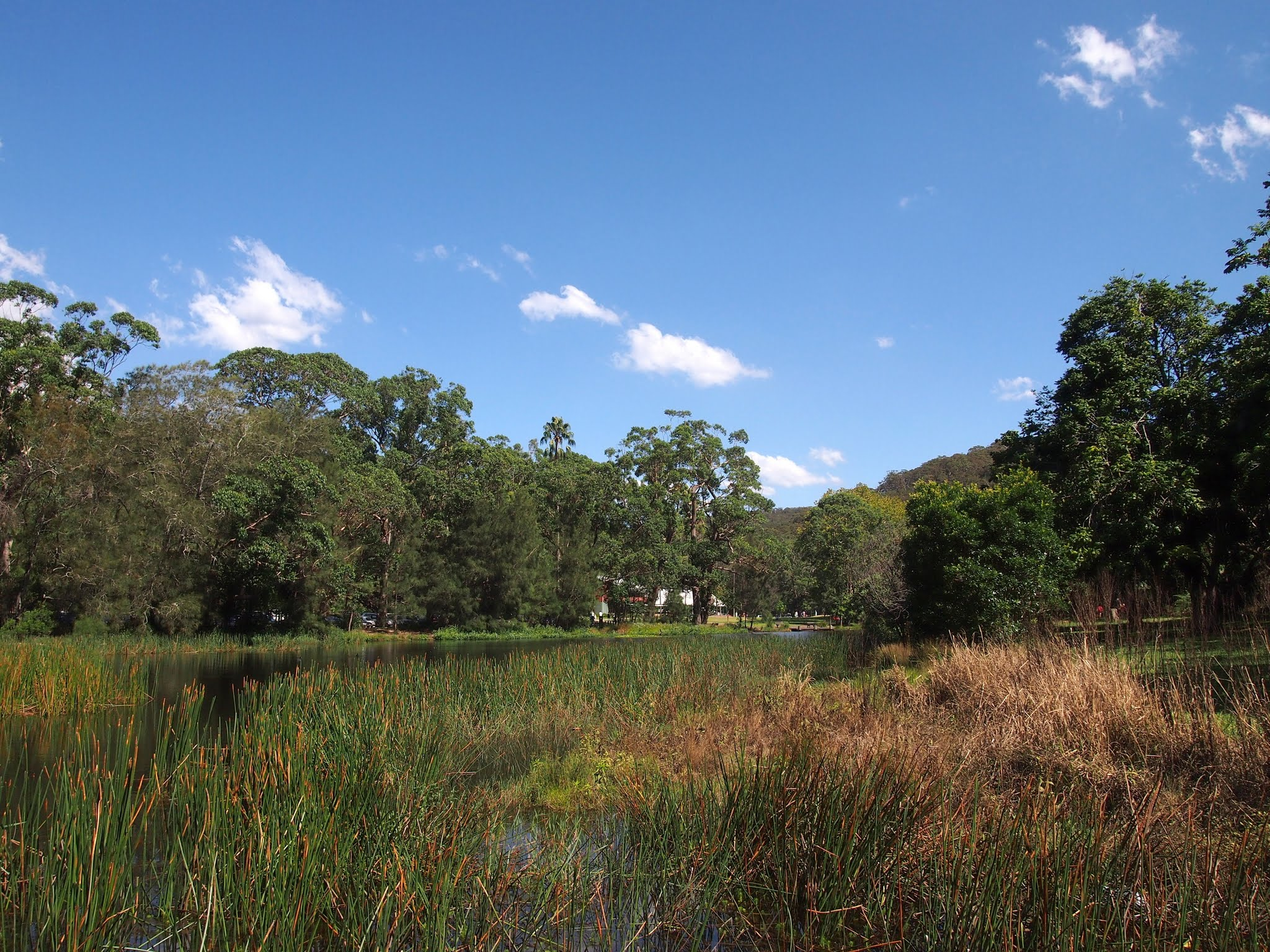
Audley Weir (#5)

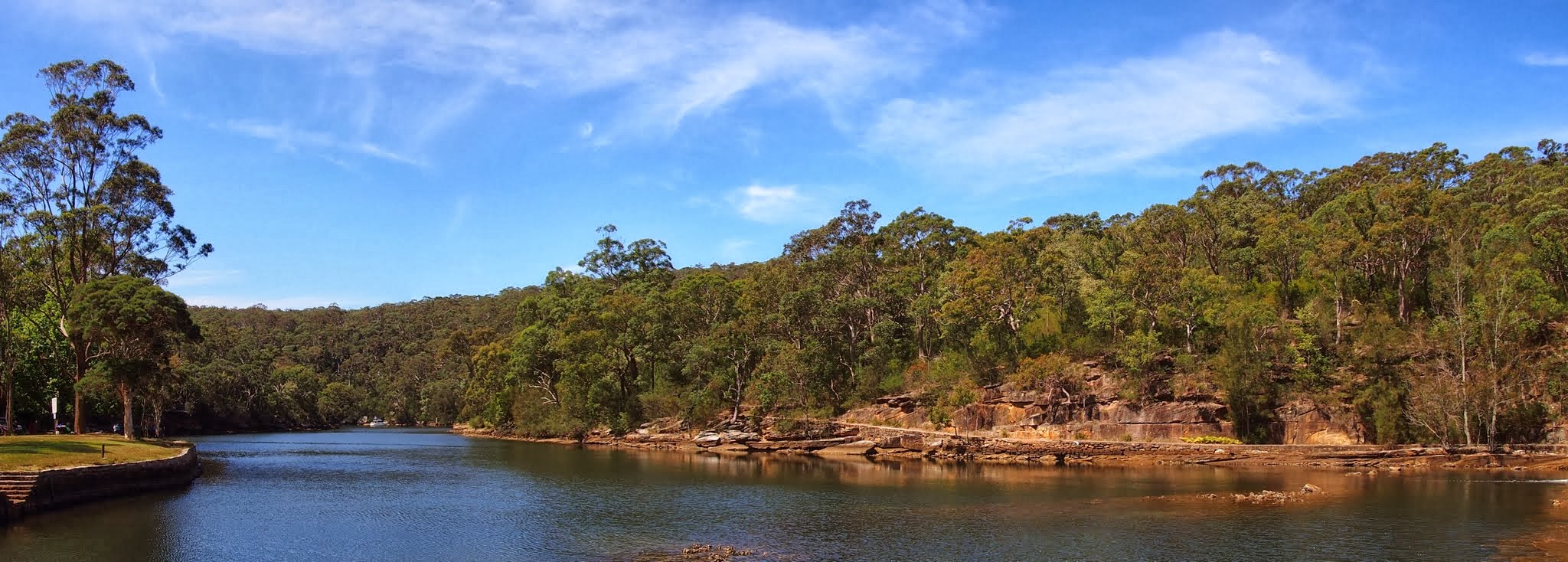
Audley Weir (#6)

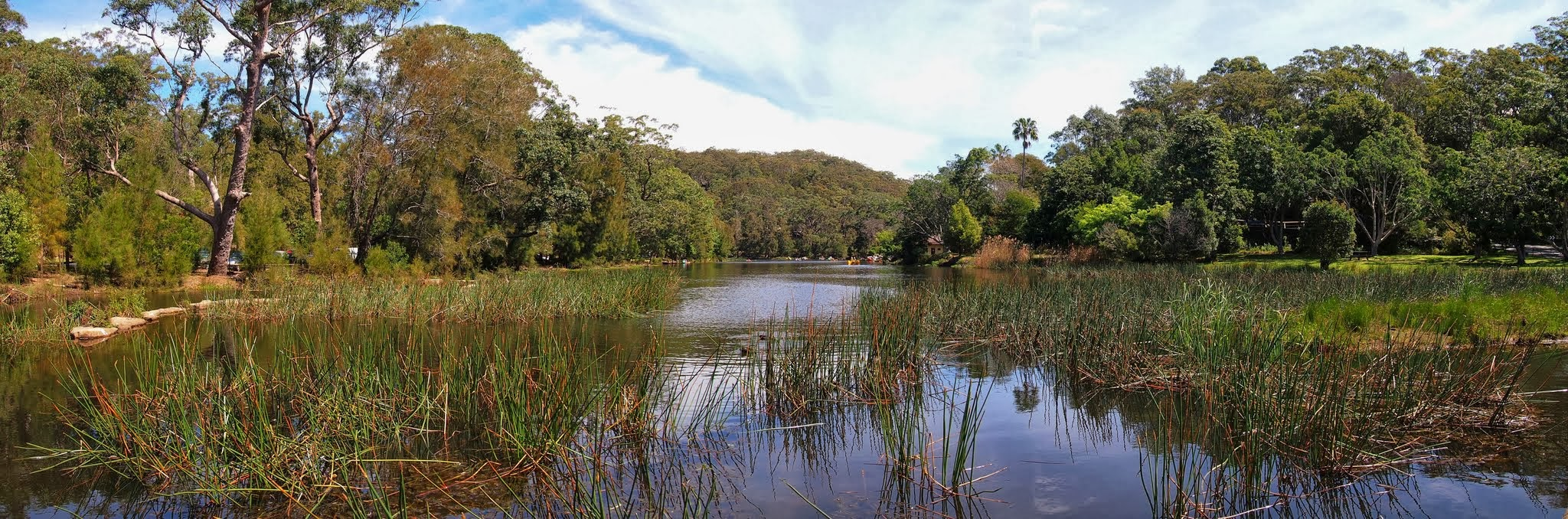
Audley Weir (#7)

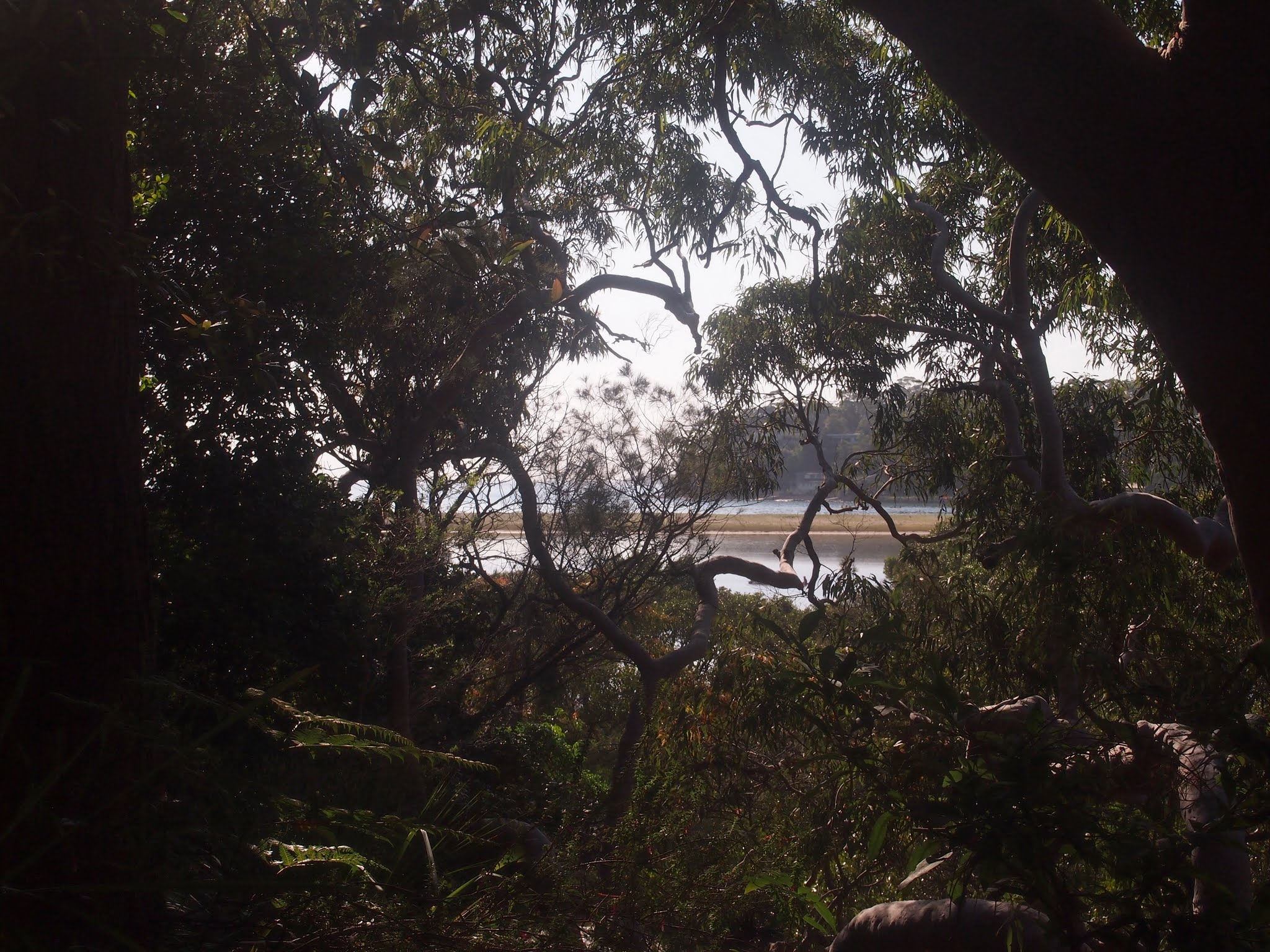
Maianbar NSW 2230, Australia – Panorama #1

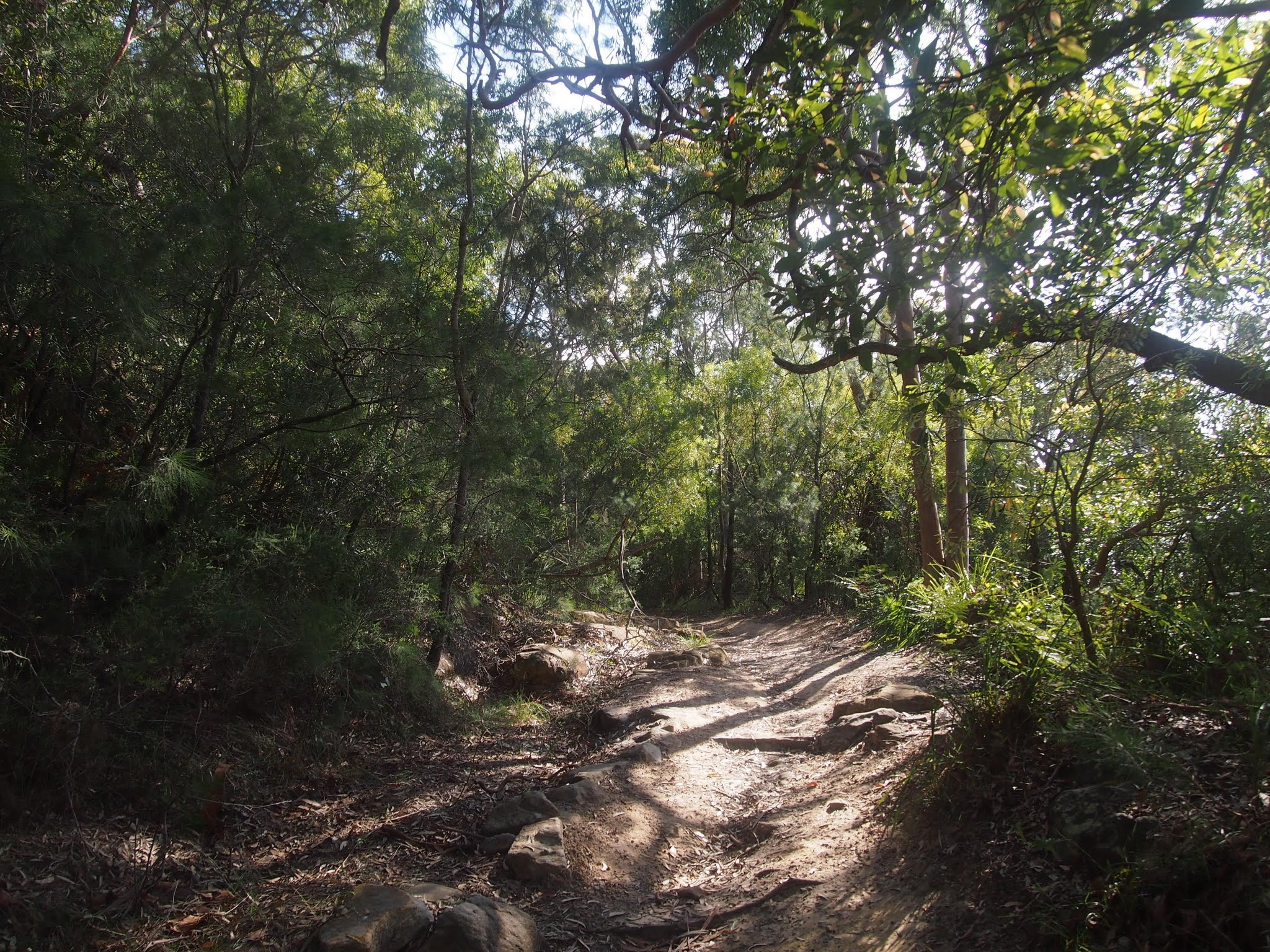
Maianbar NSW 2230, Australia – Panorama #2

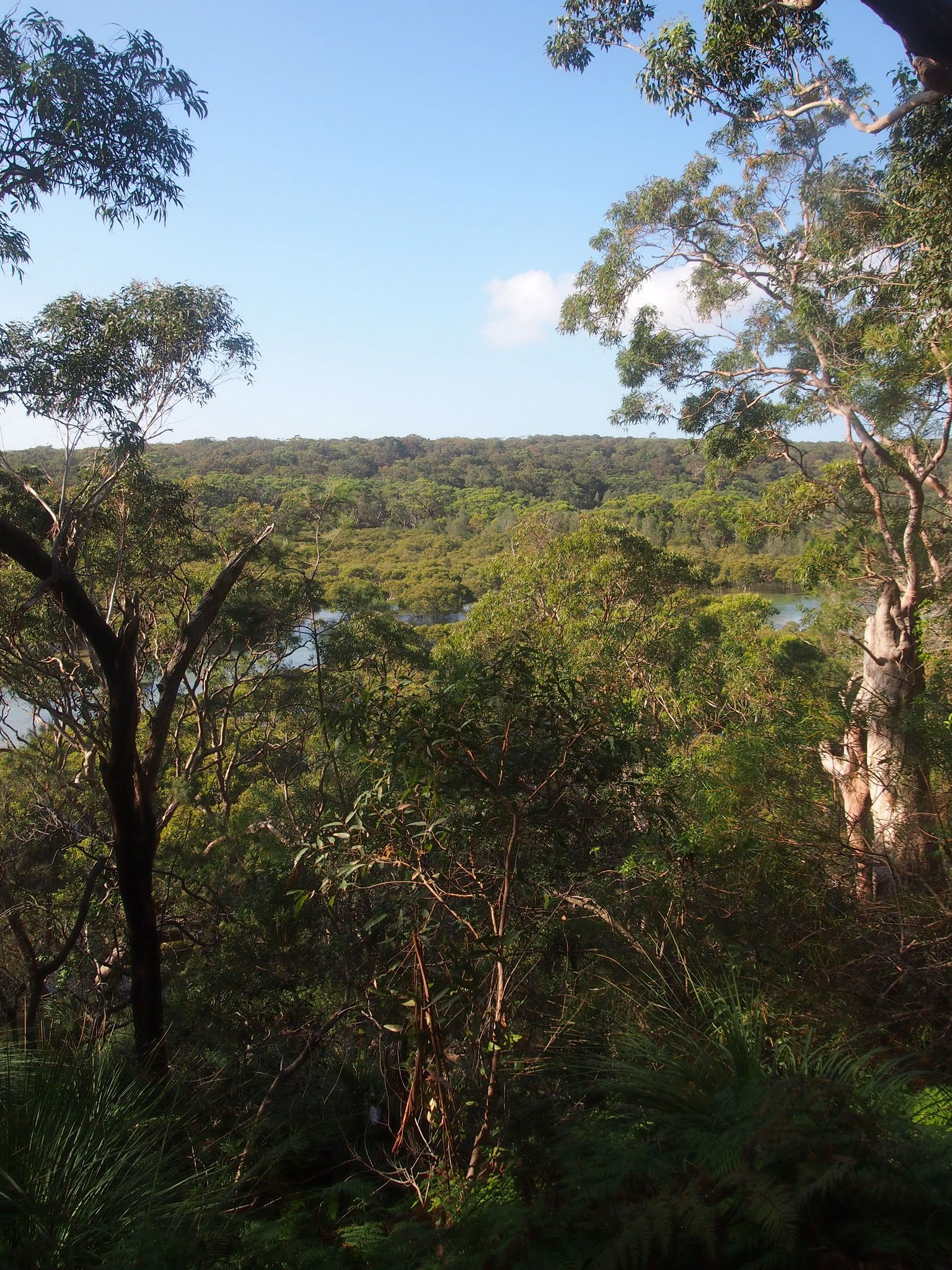
Maianbar NSW 2230, Australia – Panorama #3

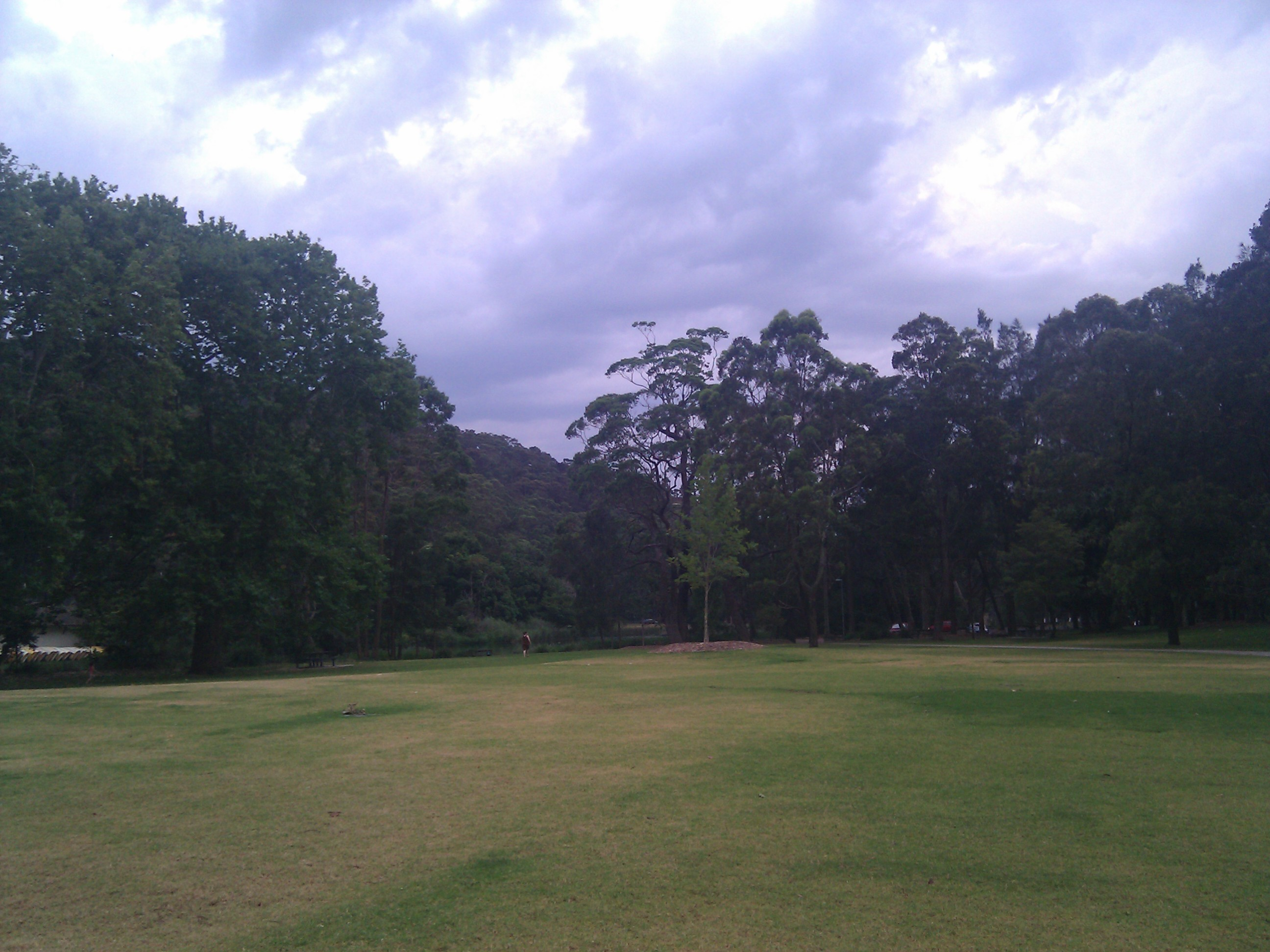
Audley NSW 2232, Australia – Panorama #1

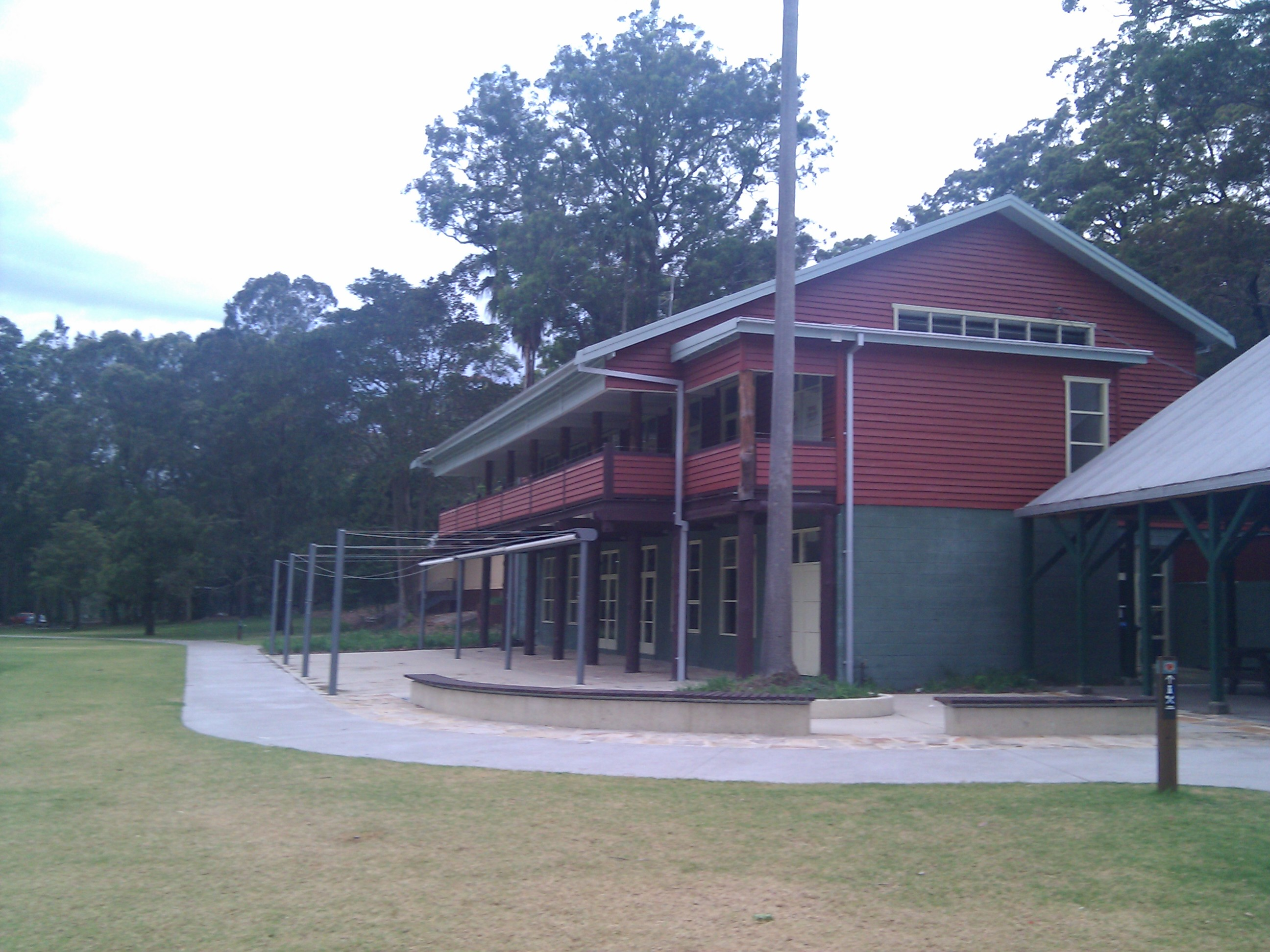
Audley NSW 2232, Australia – Panorama #2

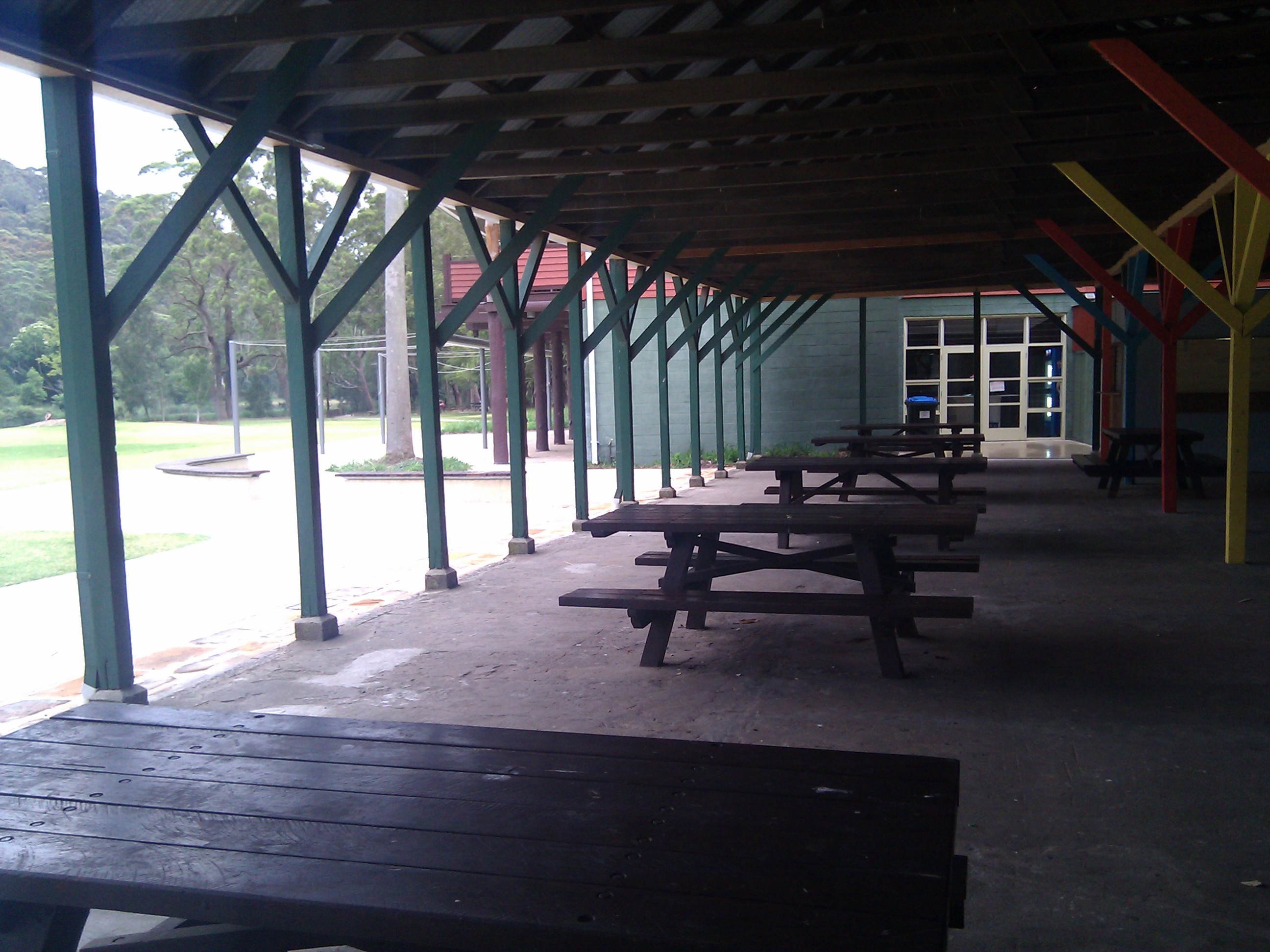
Audley NSW 2232, Australia – Panorama #3

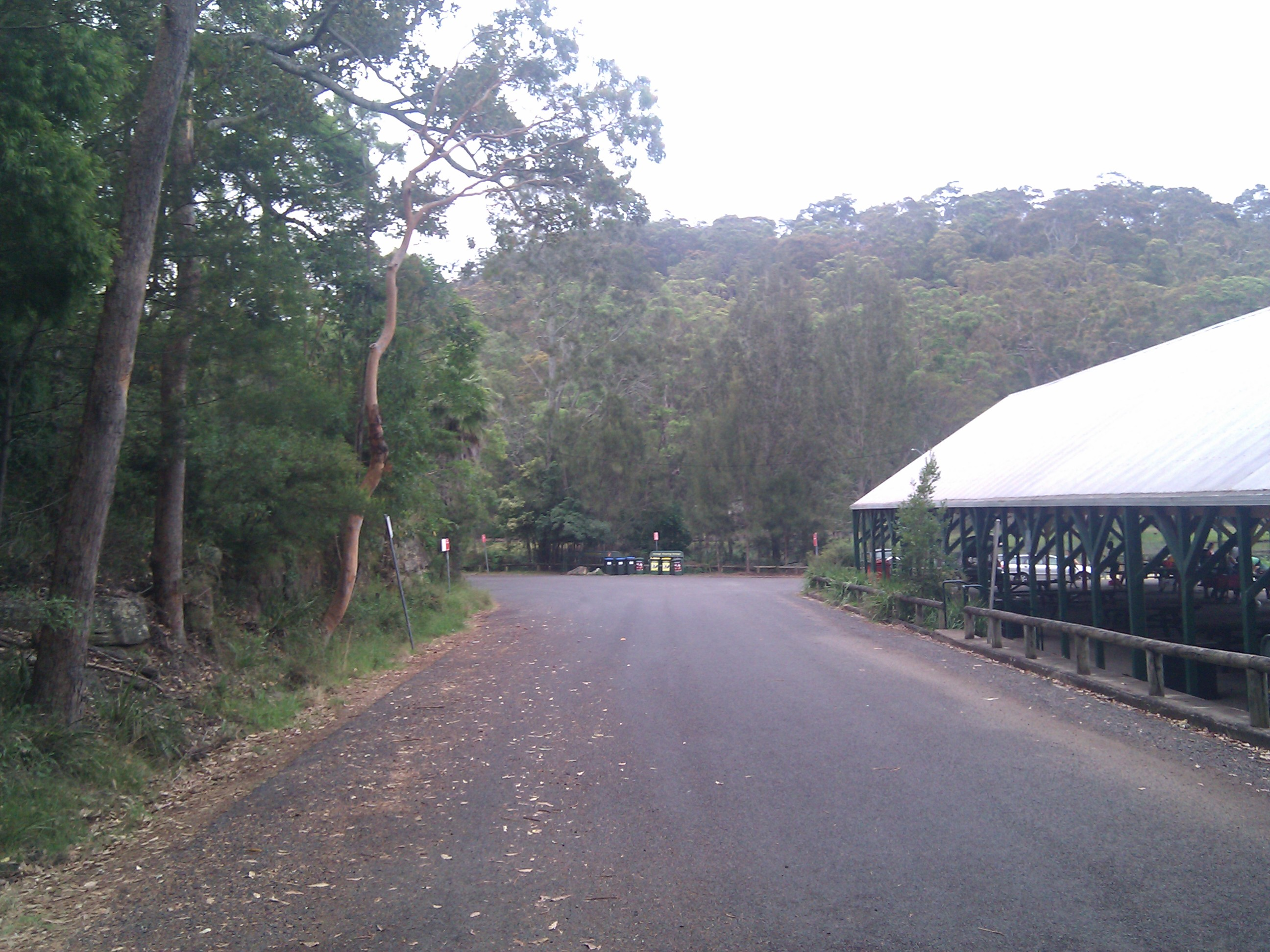
Audley NSW 2232, Australia – Panorama #4

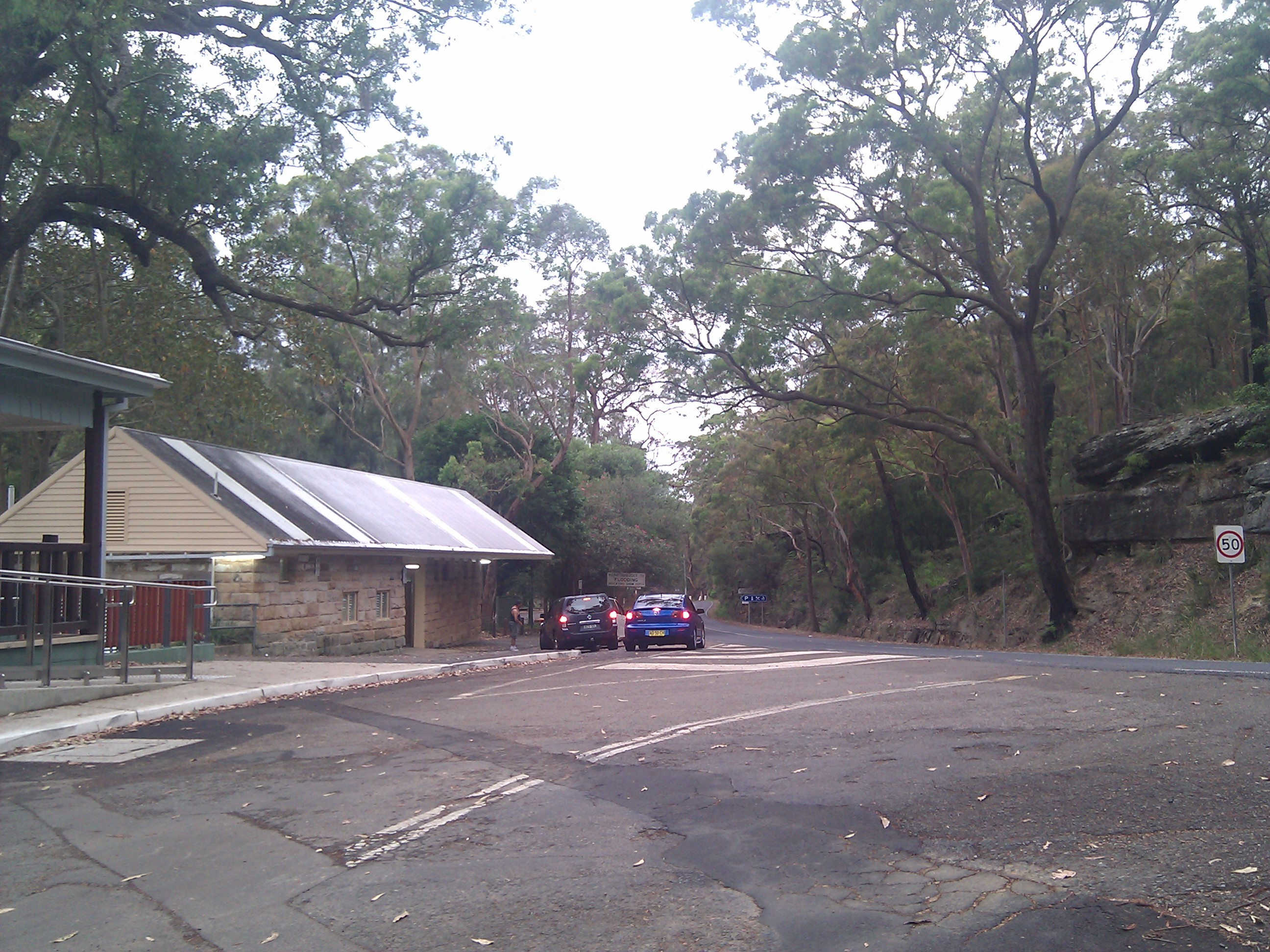
Audley NSW 2232, Australia – Panorama #5

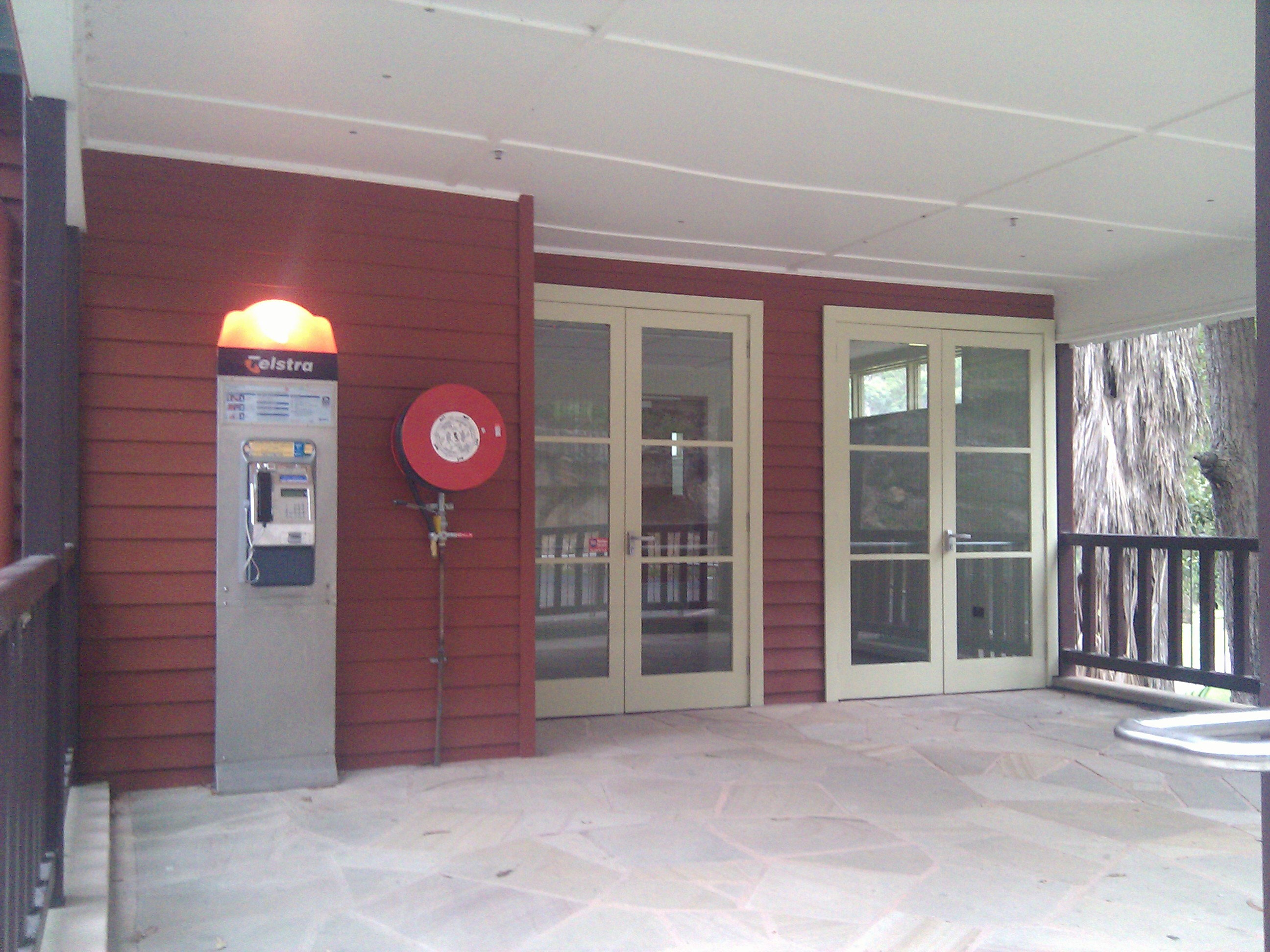
Audley NSW 2232, Australia – Panorama #6

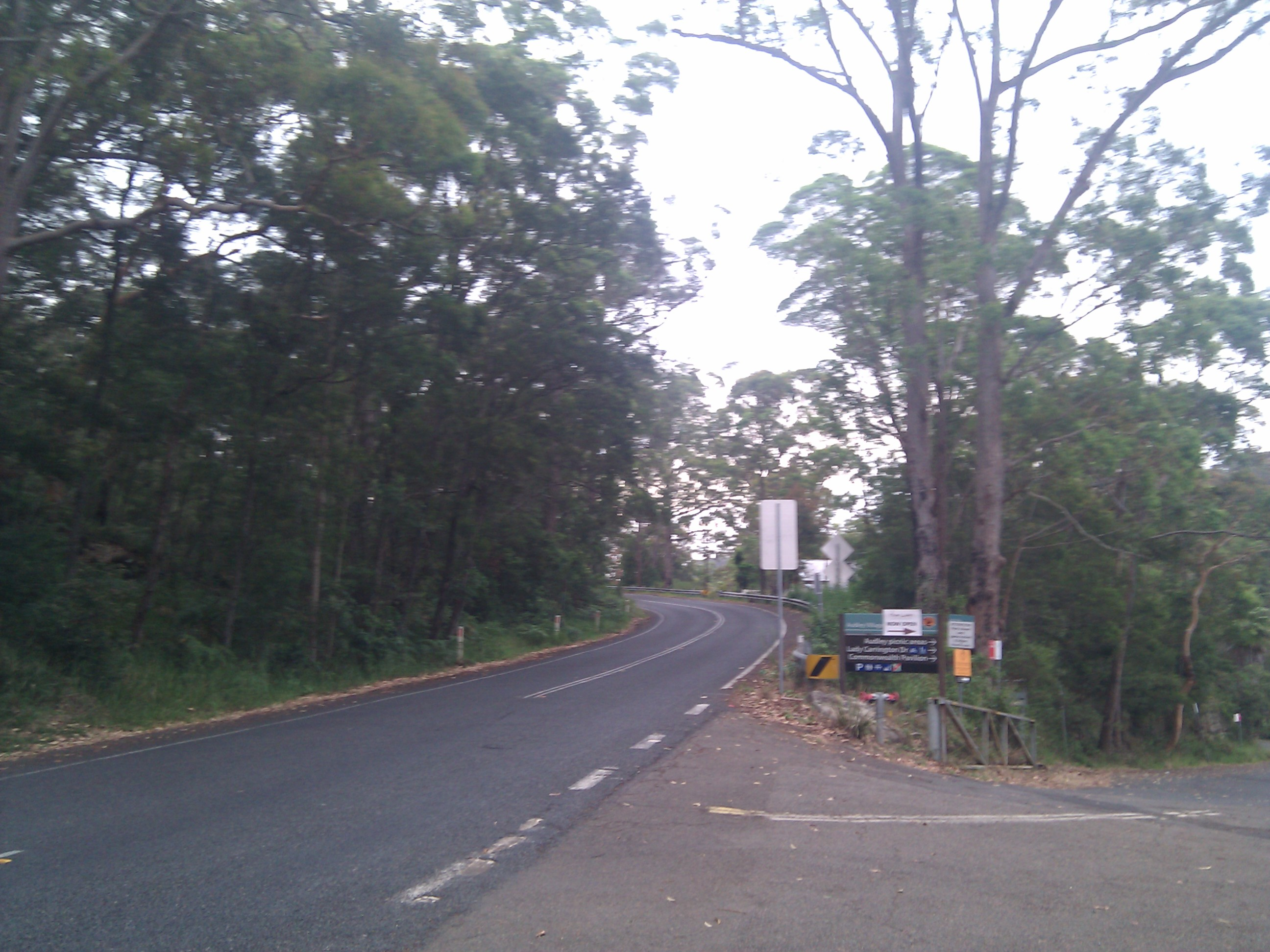
Audley NSW 2232, Australia – Panorama #7

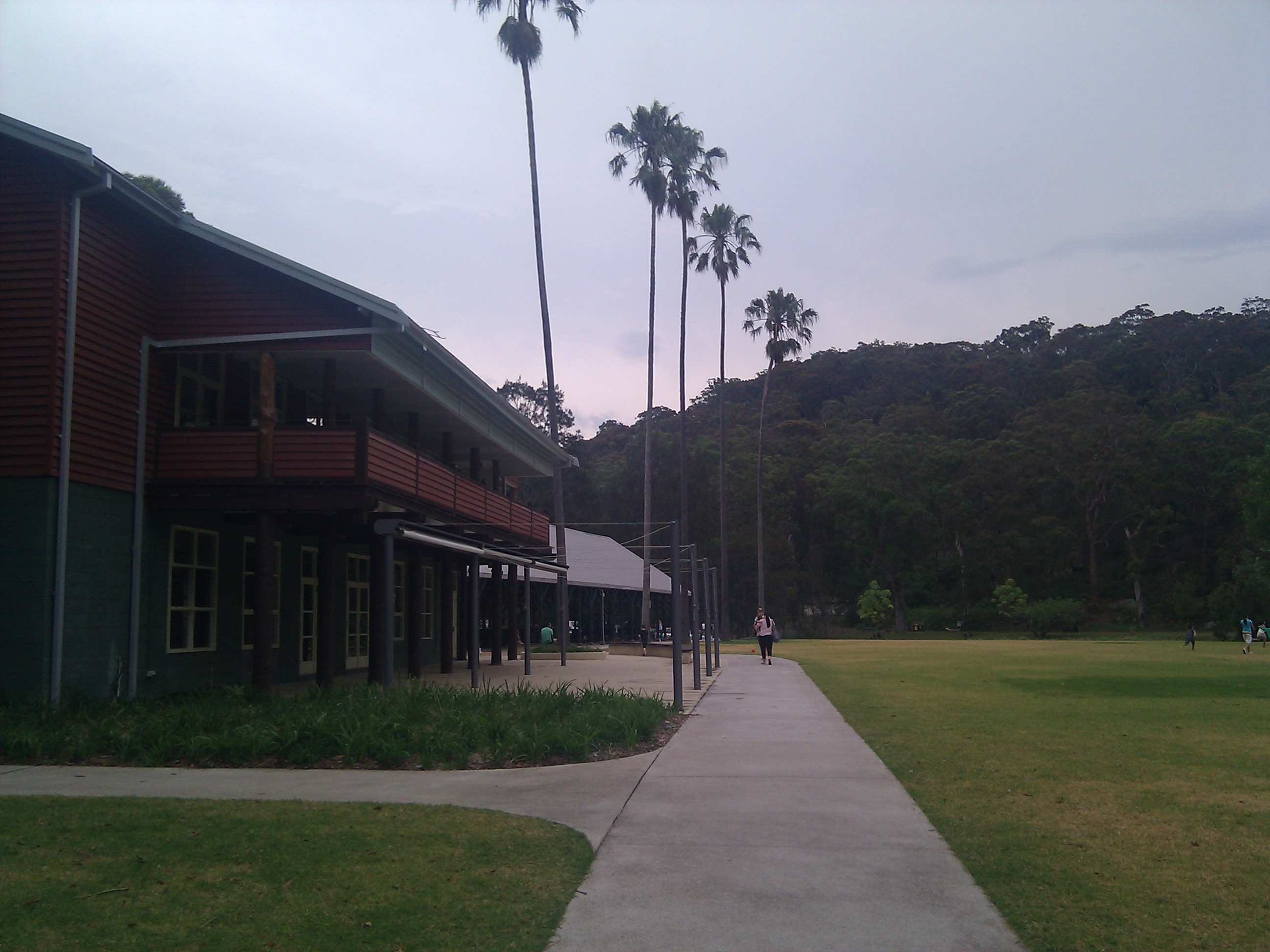
Audley NSW 2232, Australia – Panorama #8

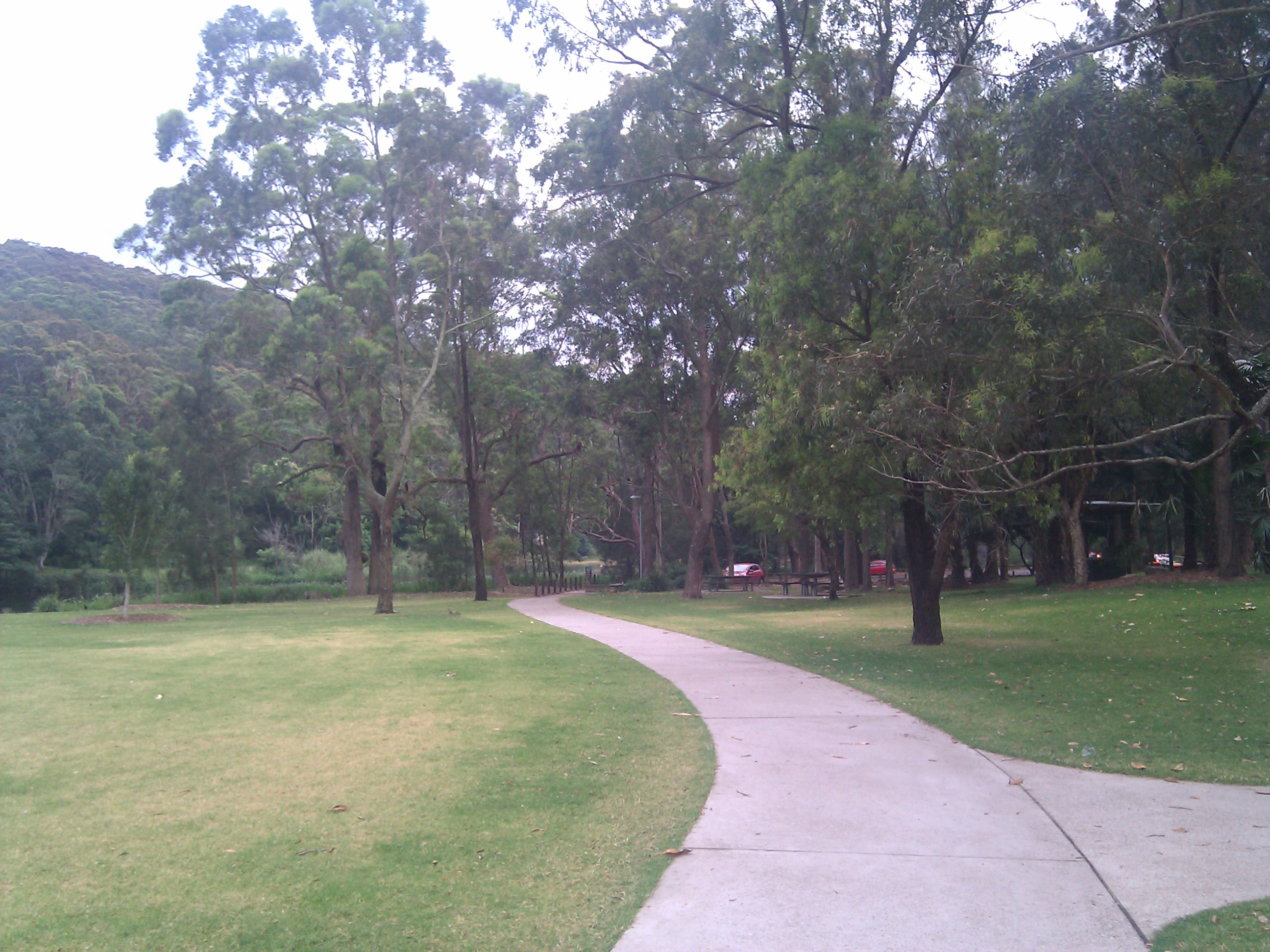
Audley NSW 2232, Australia – Panorama #9

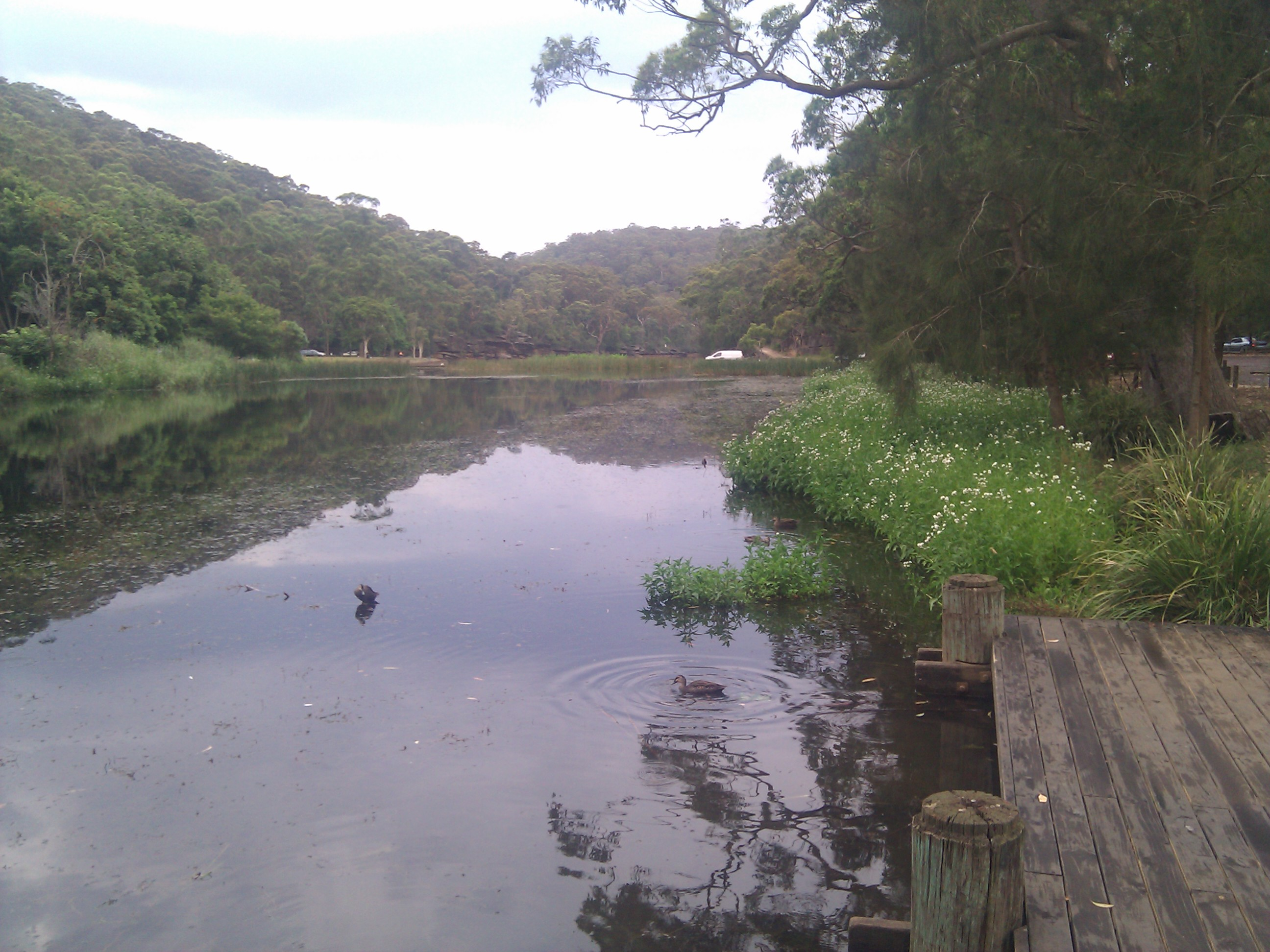
Audley NSW 2232, Australia – Panorama #10

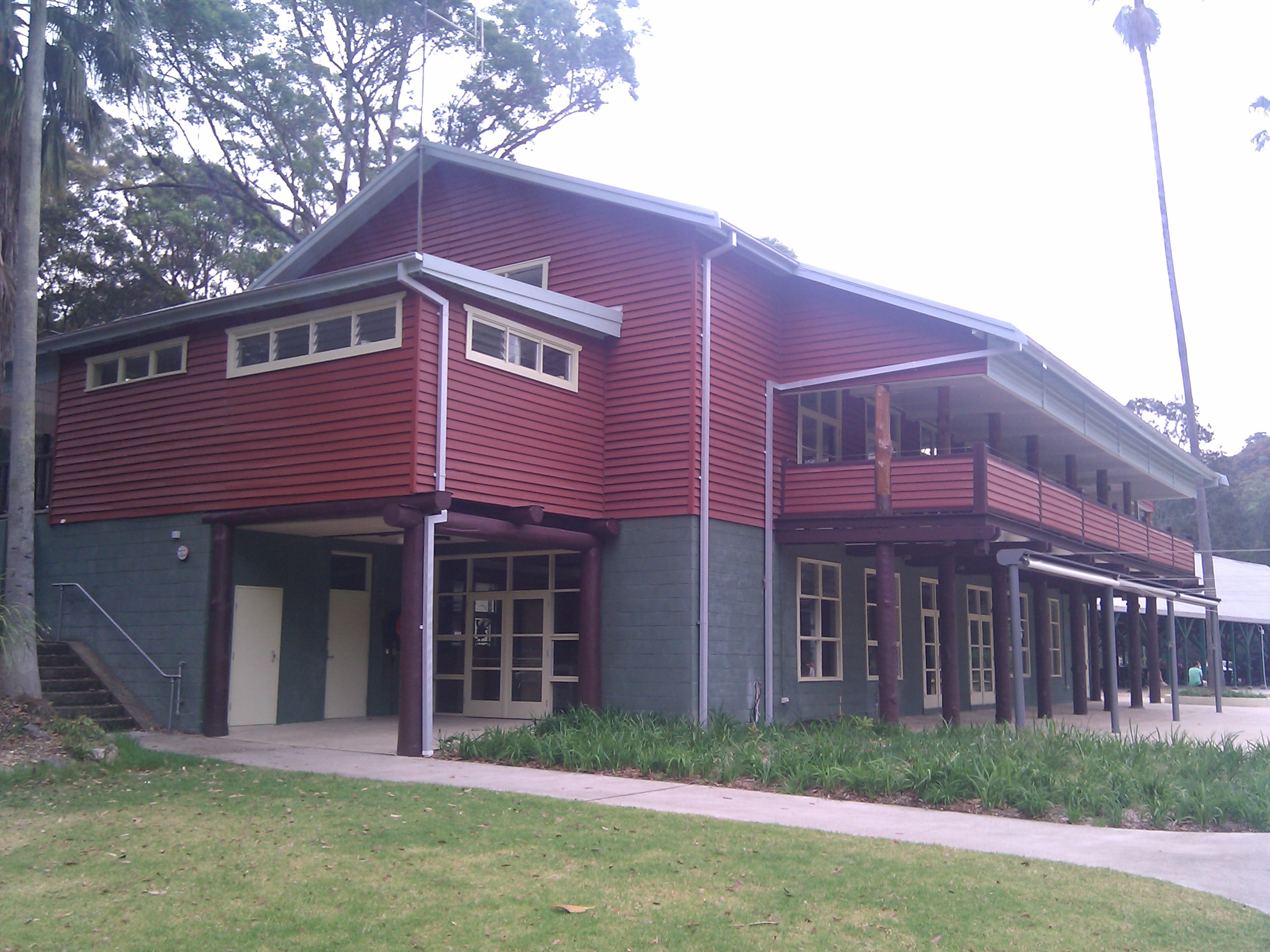
Audley NSW 2232, Australia – Panorama #11

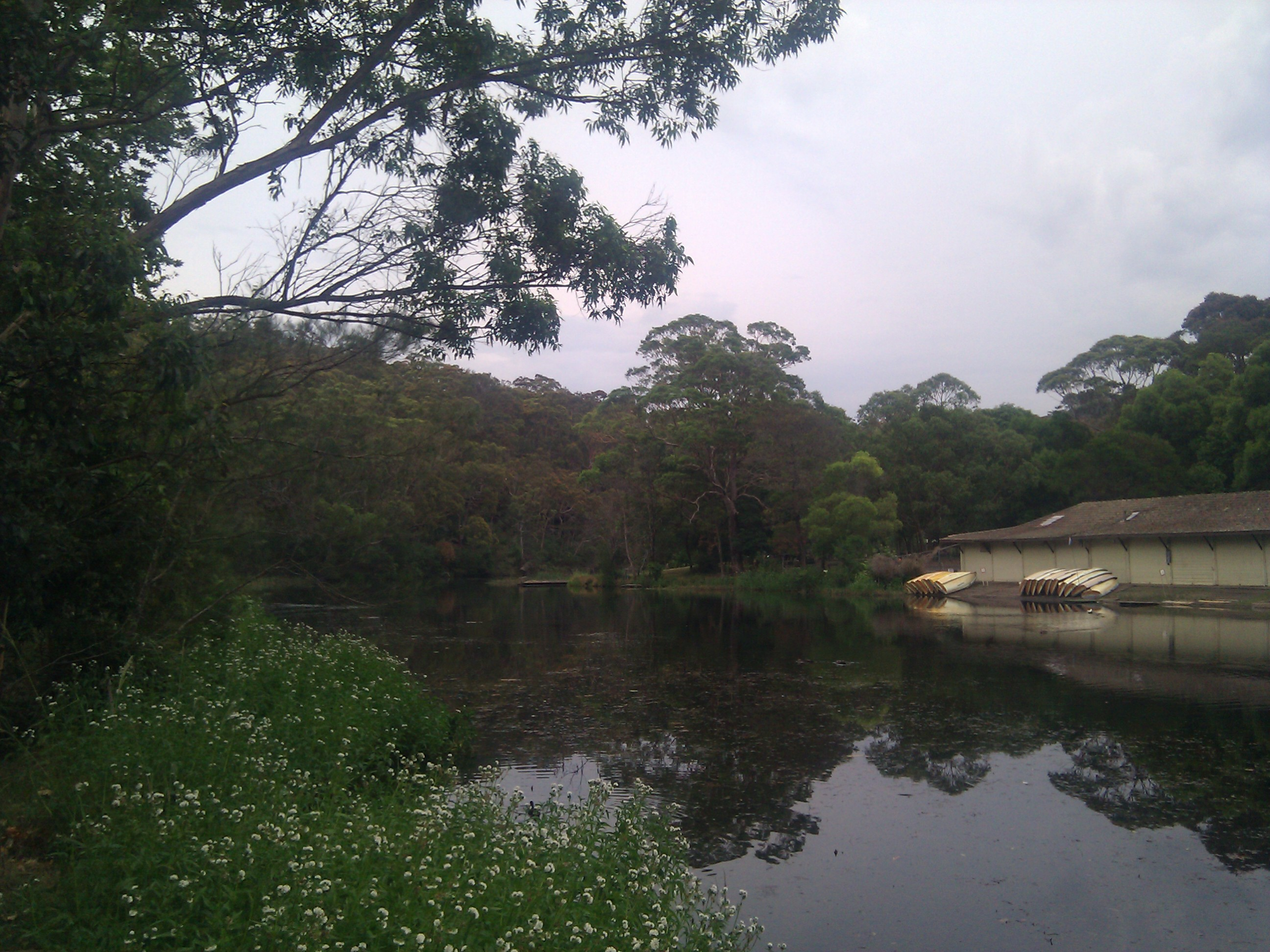
Audley NSW 2232, Australia – Panorama #12

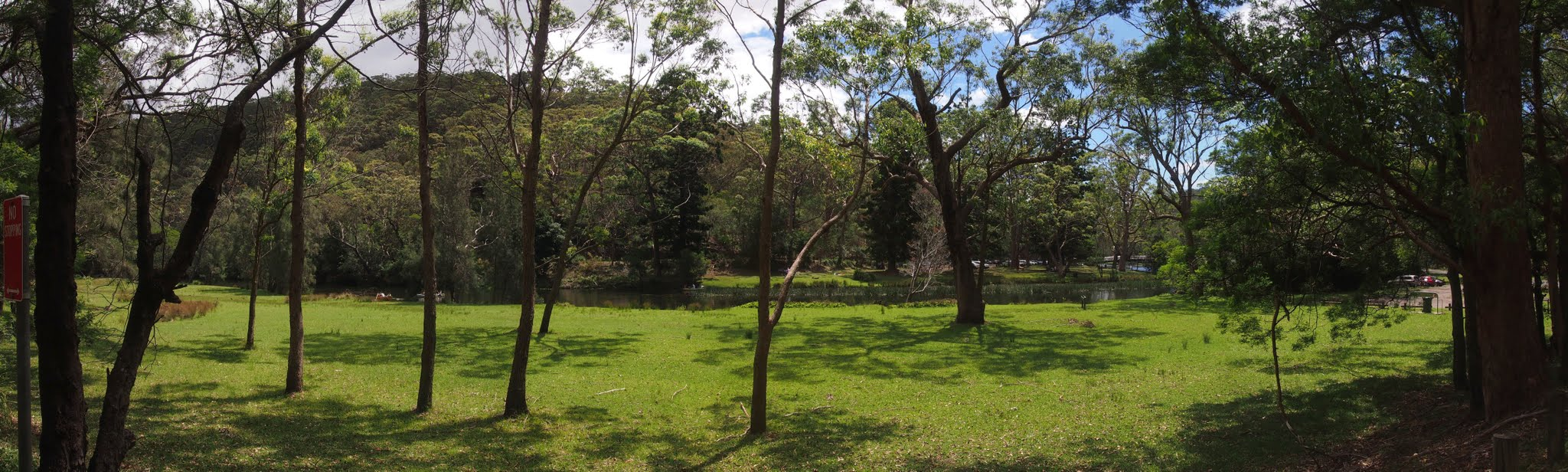
Audley NSW 2232, Australia – Panorama #13

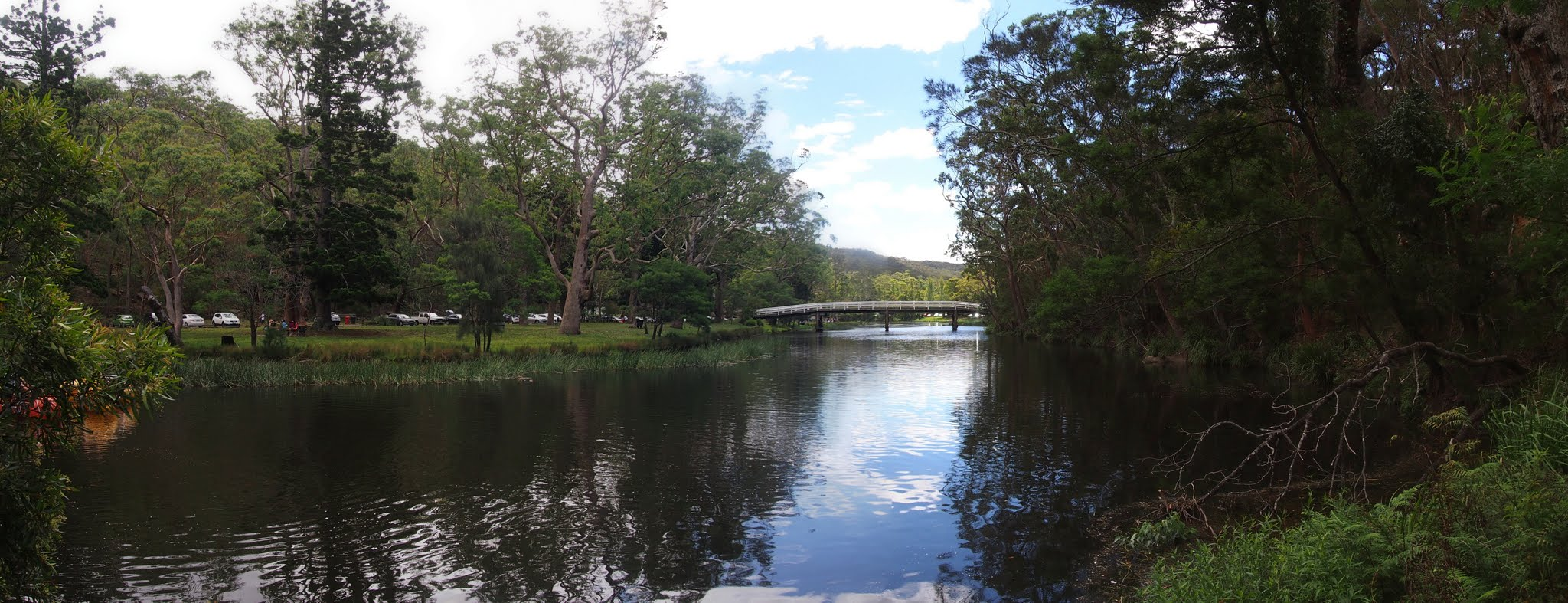
Audley NSW 2232, Australia – Panorama #14

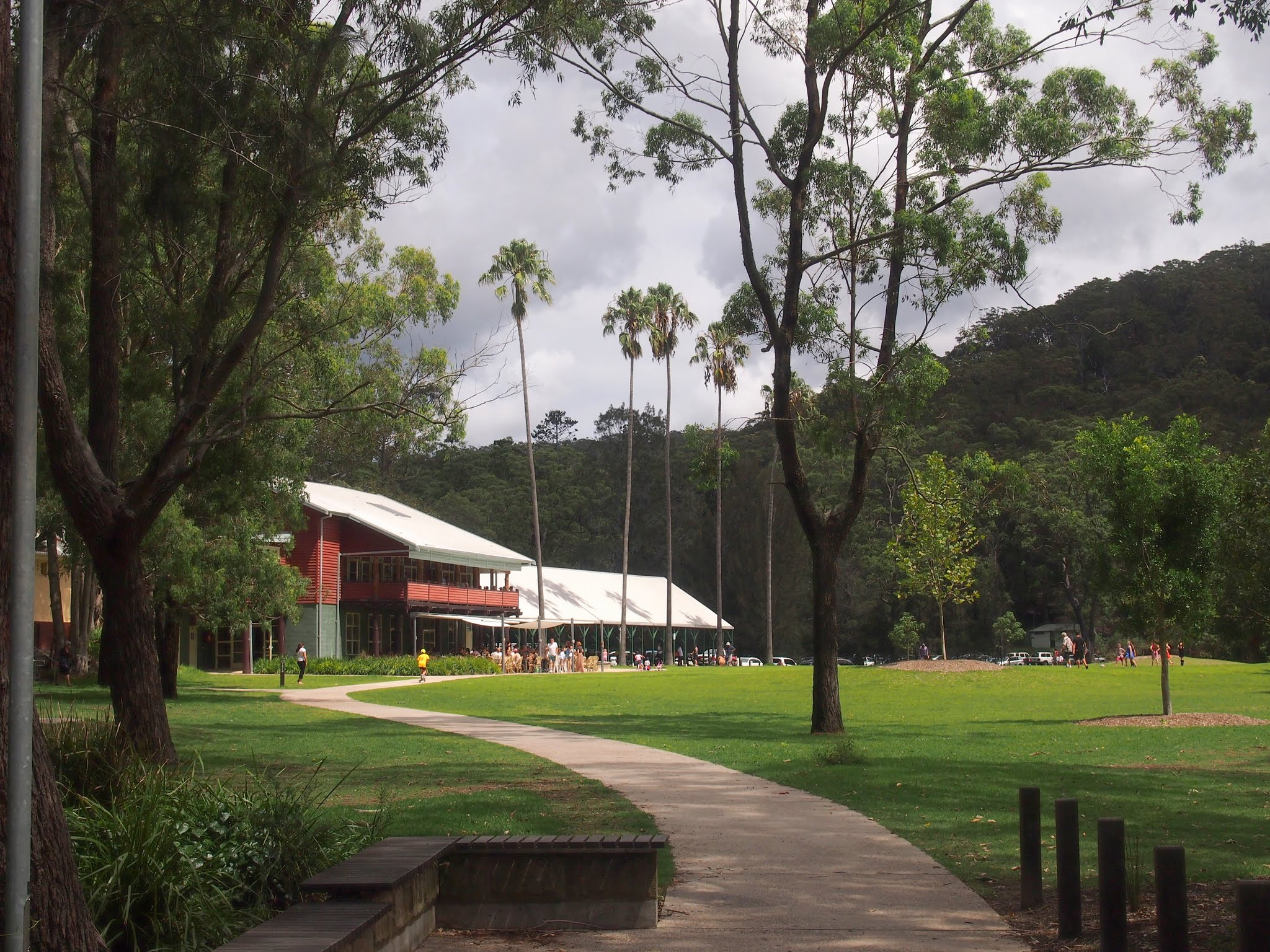
Audley NSW 2232, Australia – Panorama #15

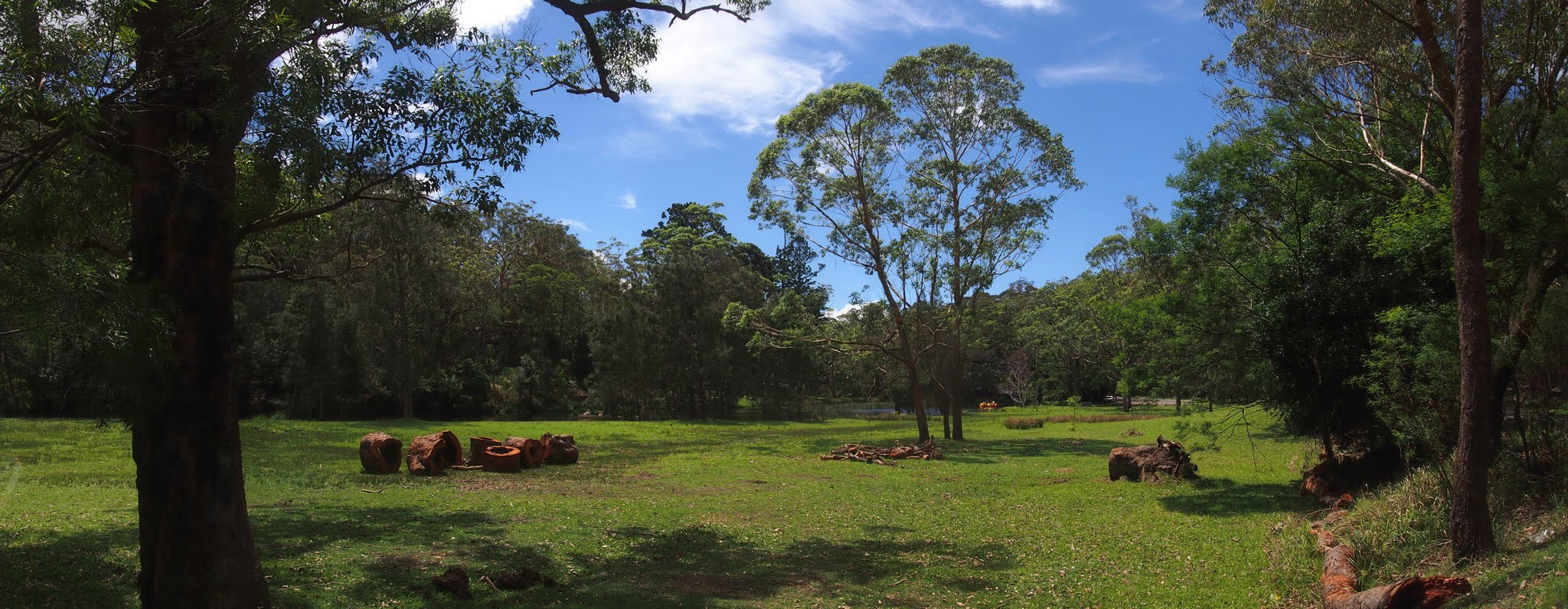
Audley NSW 2232, Australia – Panorama #16

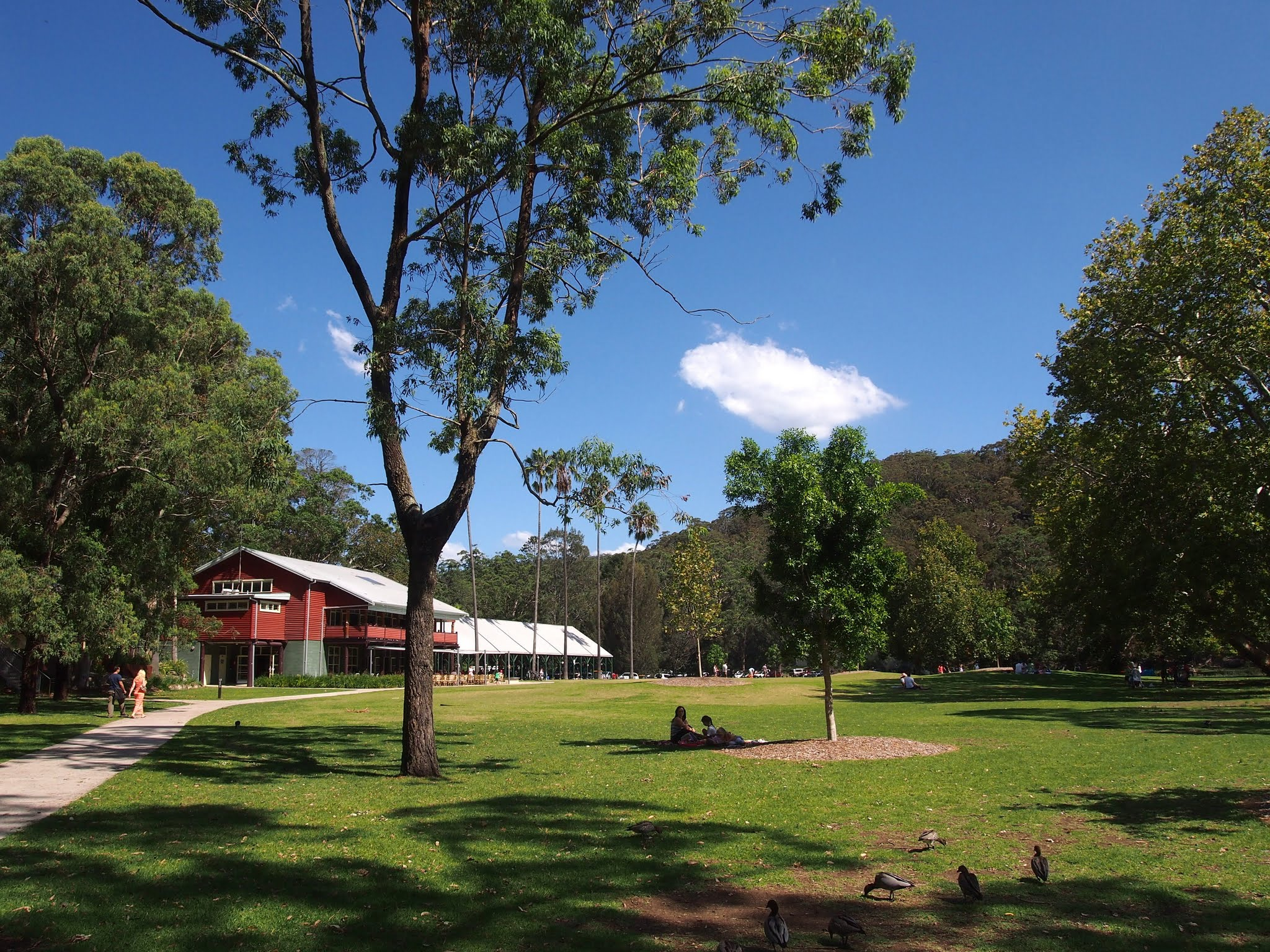
Audley NSW 2232, Australia – Panorama #17

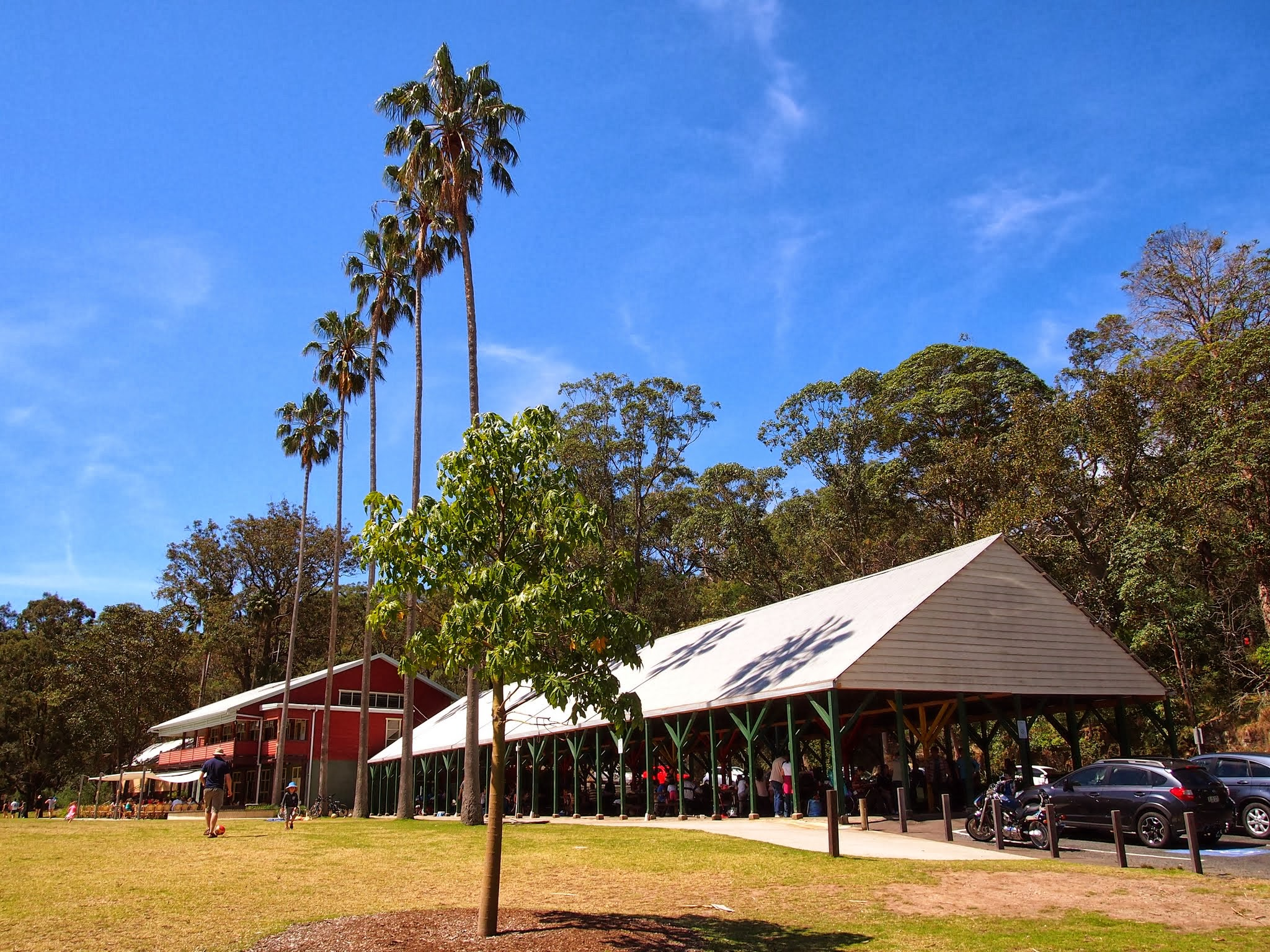
Audley NSW 2232, Australia – Panorama #18

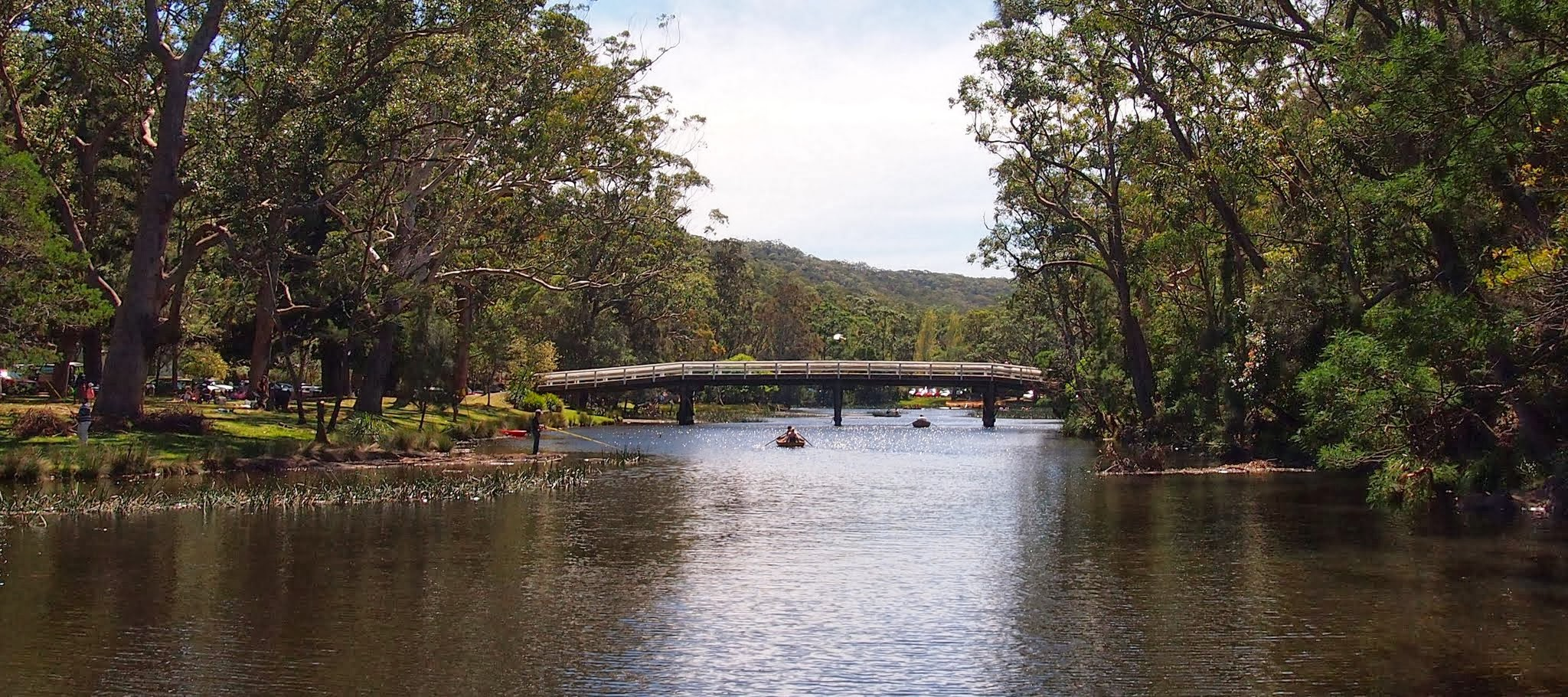
Audley NSW 2232, Australia – Panorama #19
