= Audley, New South Wales =

Audley
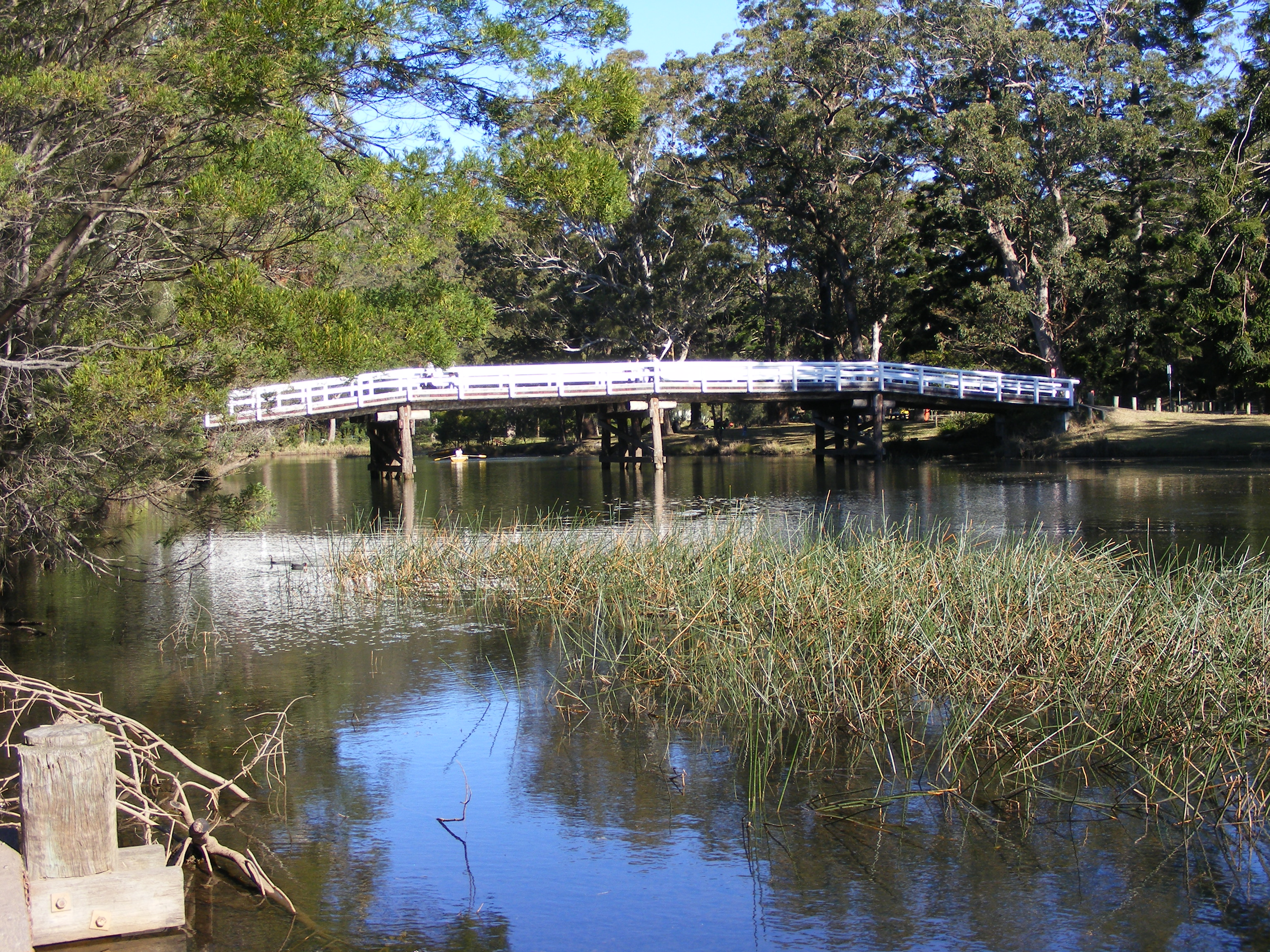

- Interactive map of Audley
- Coordinates: 34°04′23″S 151°03′24″E
- Country: Australia
- State: New South Wales
- City: Sydney
- LGA: Sutherland Shire
- Location: 35 km (22 mi) from Sydney CBD
- Established: 1900s

Government
  - State electorate: Heathcote
  - Federal divisions: Cunningham; Hughes
- Elevation: 160 m (520 ft)
- Postcode: 2232

Audley is a locality on the outskirts of southern Sydney, in the state of New South Wales, Australia. It is located in the Royal National Park and is part of the Sutherland Shire.

== Geography ==
Kangaroo Creek joins the Hacking River at Audley. A causeway crosses the river here, which is subject to flooding and occasional road closure for travellers into the Royal National Park, and communities at Bundeena/Maianbar. Audley features extensive picnic areas, boat hire facilities, a bike track and a visitor's centre. Audley is also the location of the administrative headquarters for the Royal National Park.

== History ==
The area was surveyed by Lord George Edward Audley in 1863–64, where he set up camp. He later married Emily, second daughter of Major Sir Thomas Mitchell, the Surveyor-General.

Floodgates were constructed in Audley in 1900. Audley developed into a small village of amusements, surrounded by 'pleasure gardens'. It was popular with holiday-makers and honeymooners who could stay at the Allambie House guesthouse. A dance hall was built here in the 1940s, which still stands today.

== Heritage listings ==
Audley has a number of heritage-listed sites, including:

- Sir Bertram Stevens & Audley Road: Audley historic recreational complex

== Gallery ==
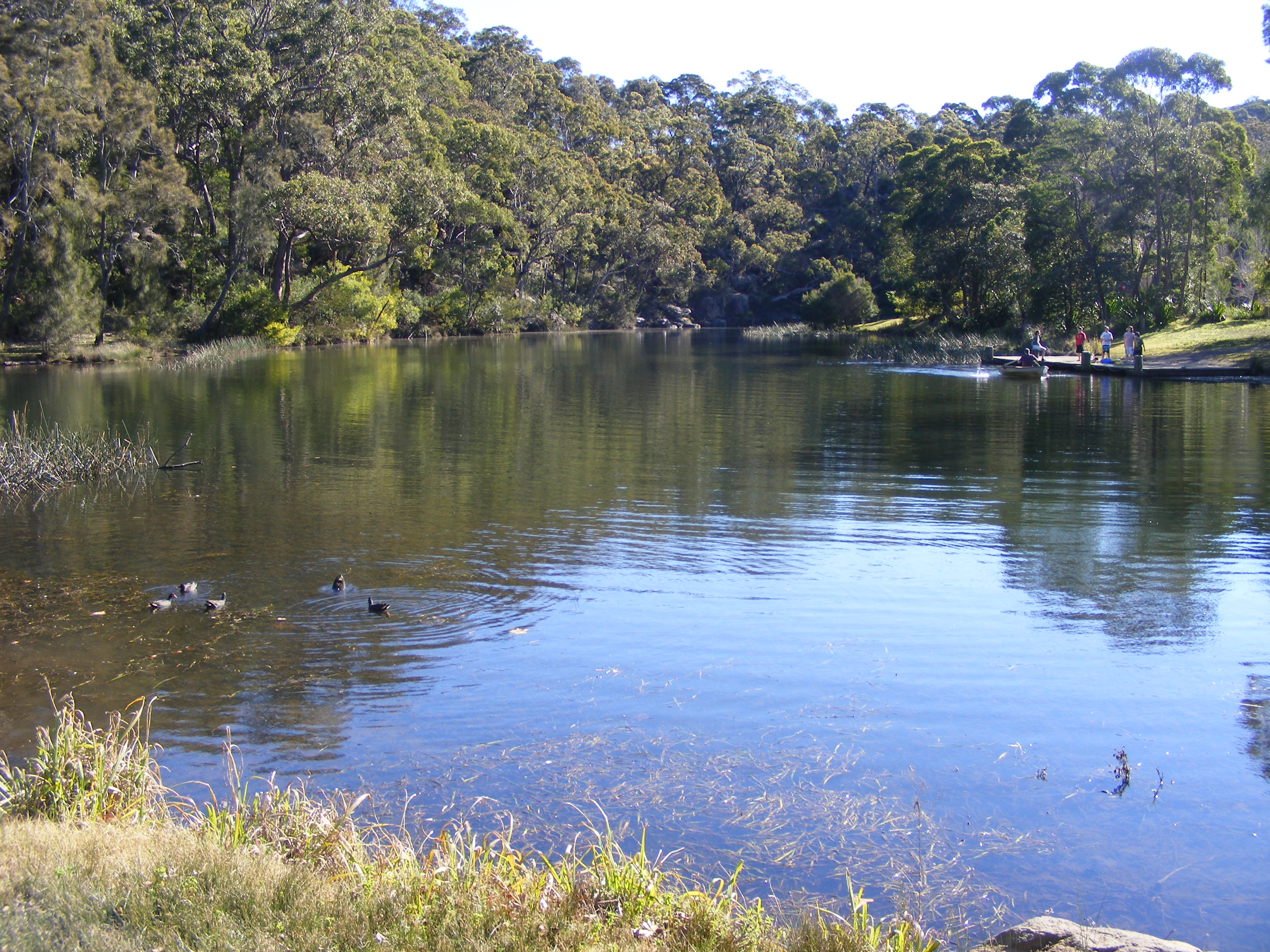
The Hacking River, at Audley.

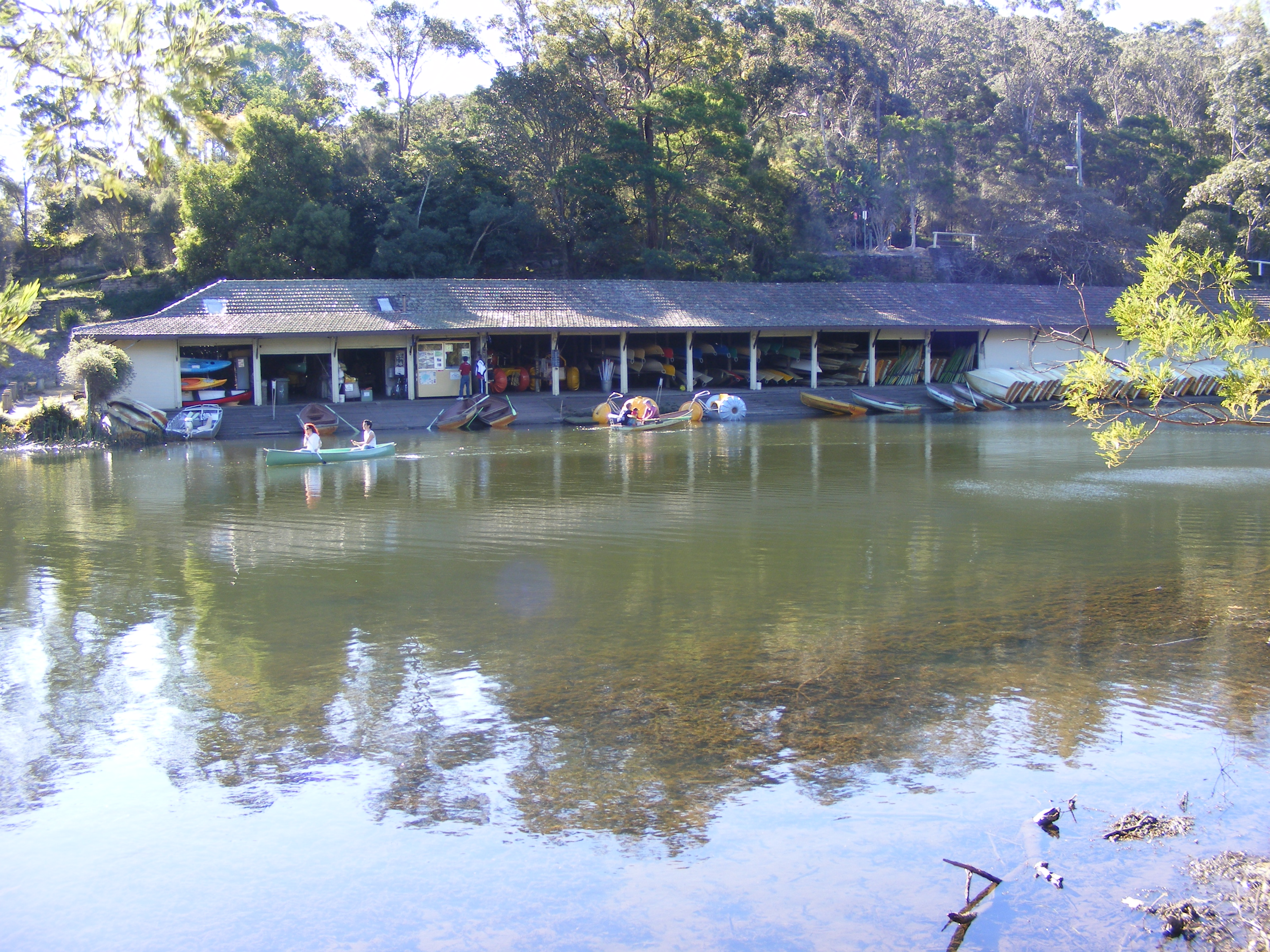
The boat shed

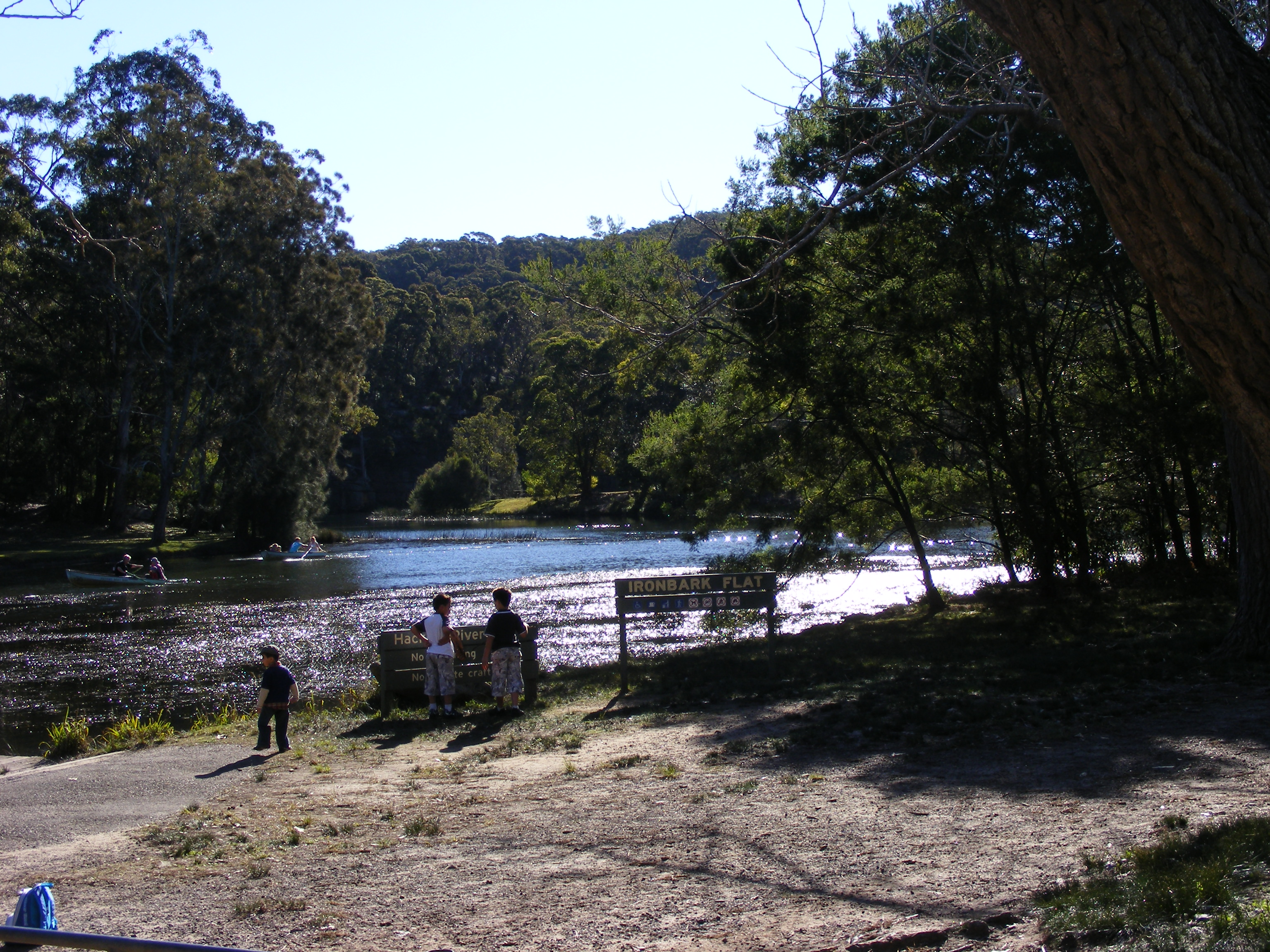

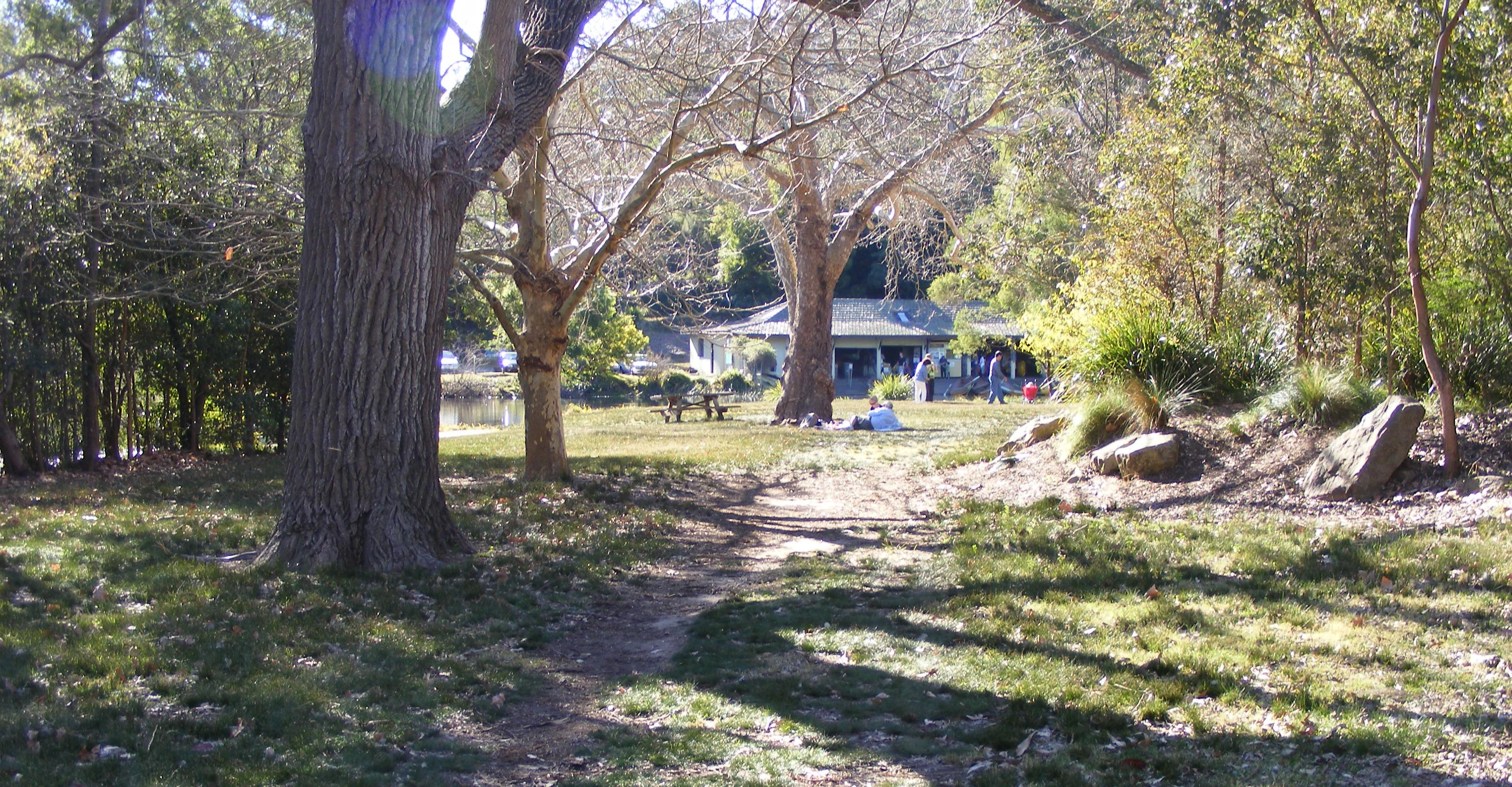
Picnic area

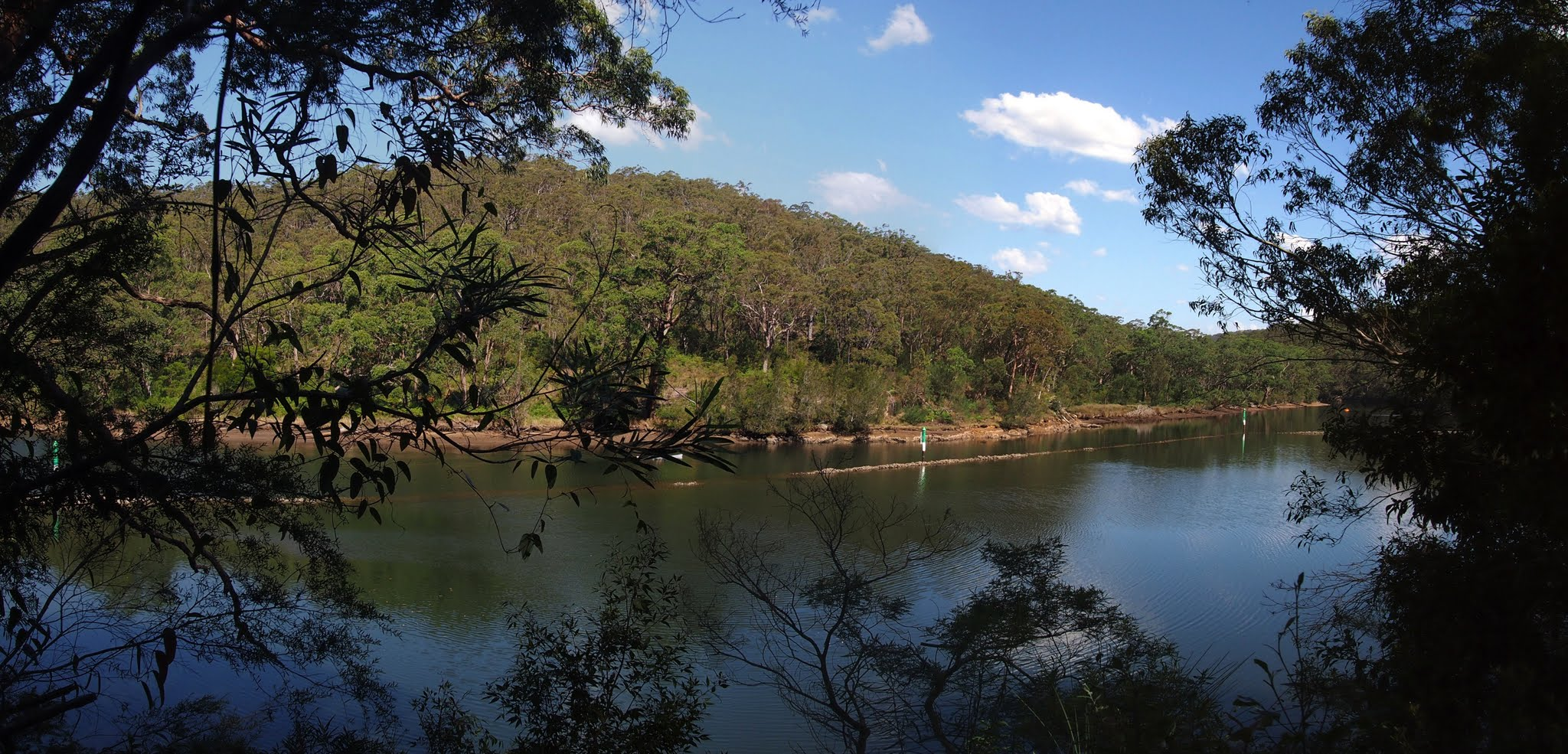
Riverside Drive (#1)

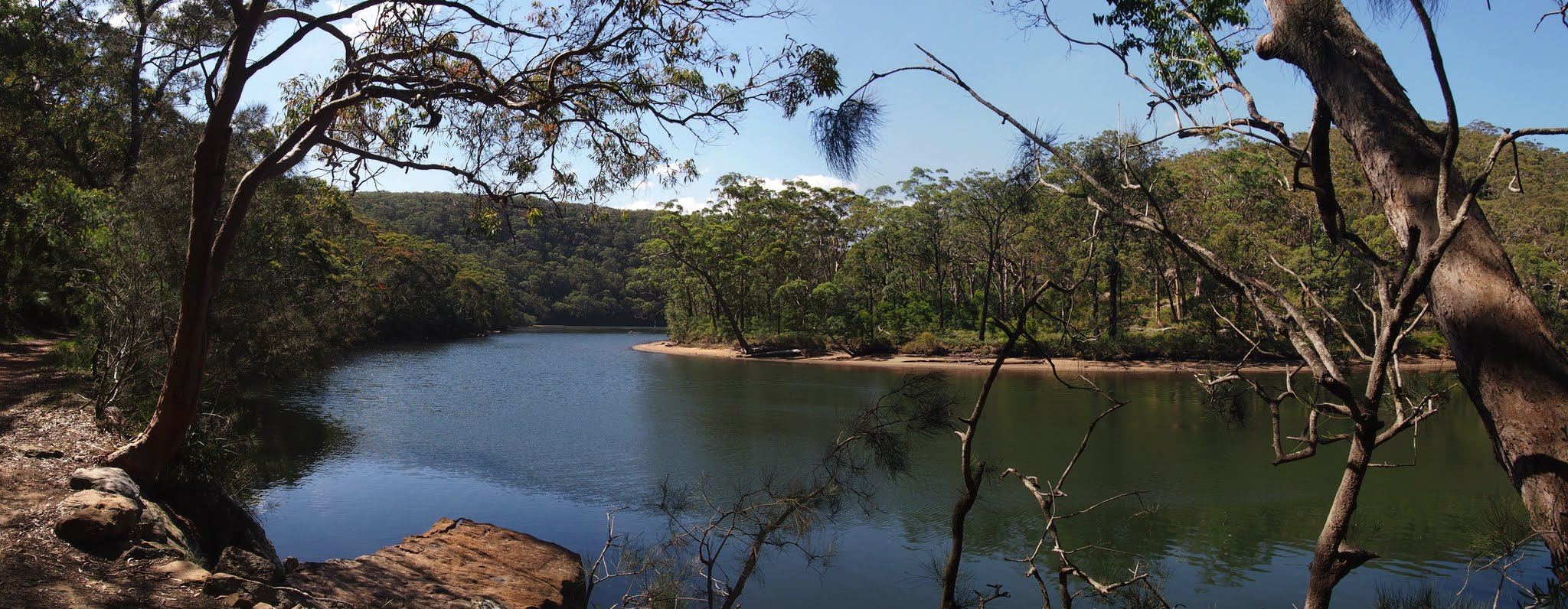
Riverside Drive (#2)

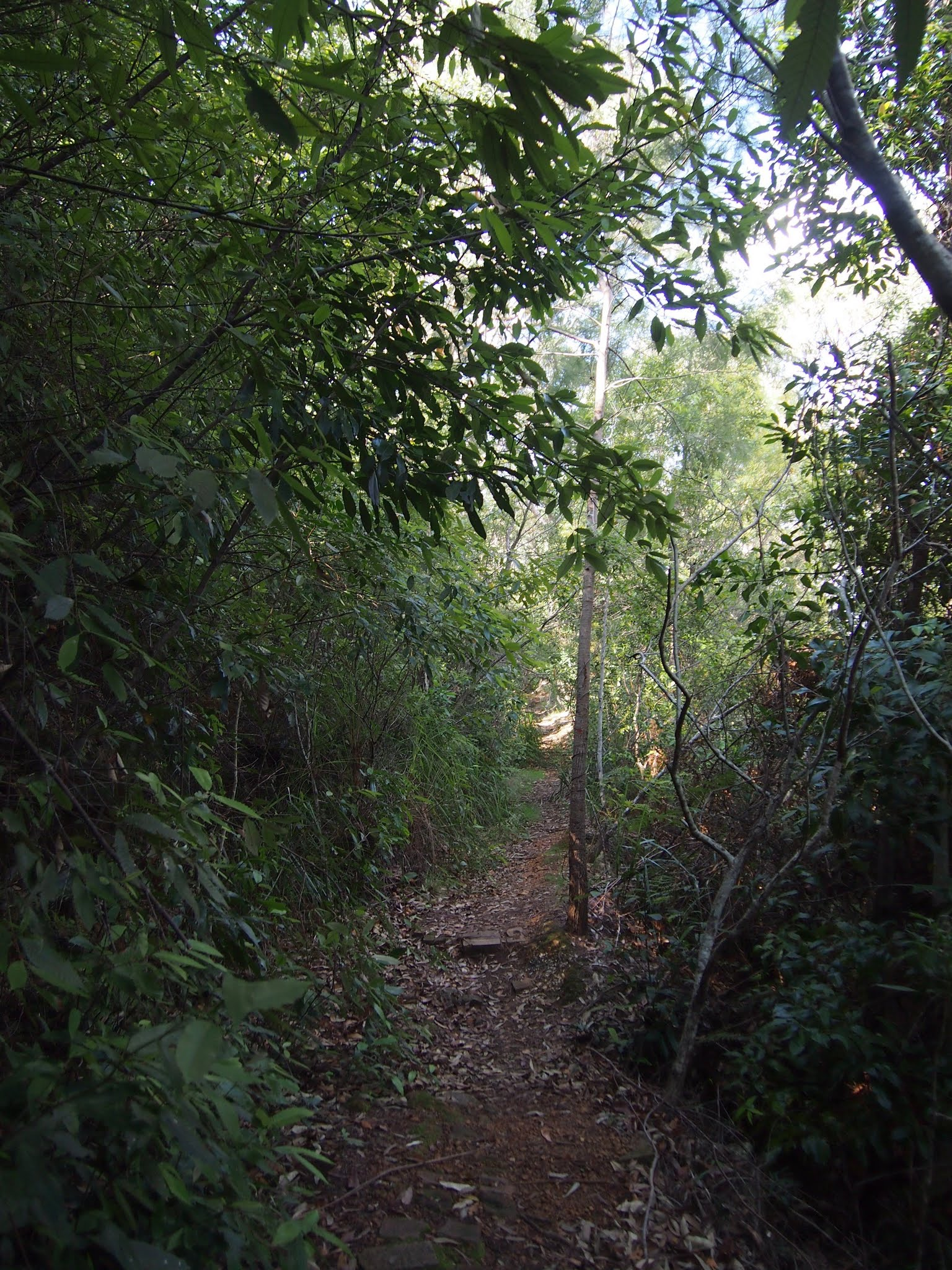
Riverside Drive (#3)

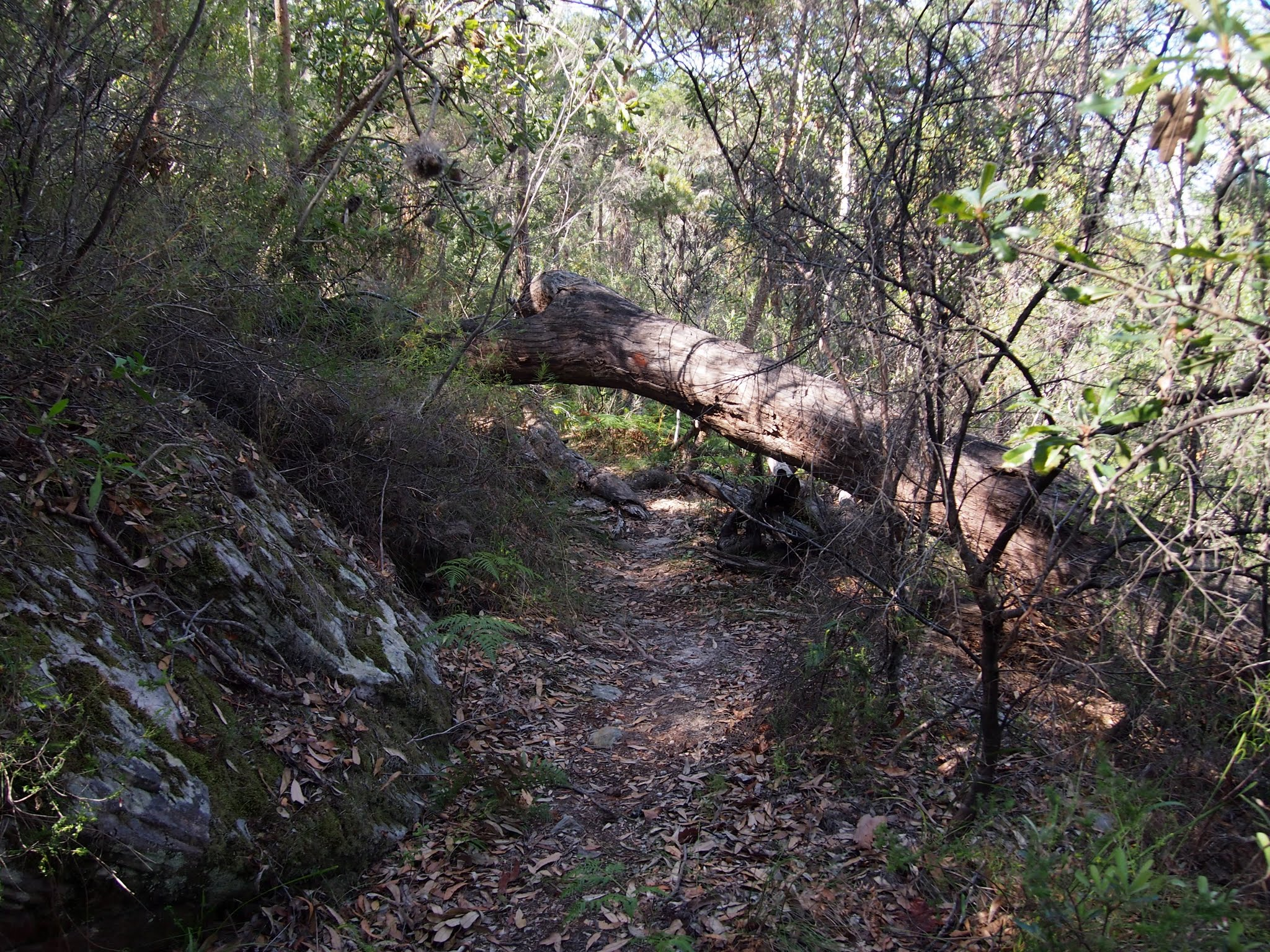
Riverside Drive (#4)

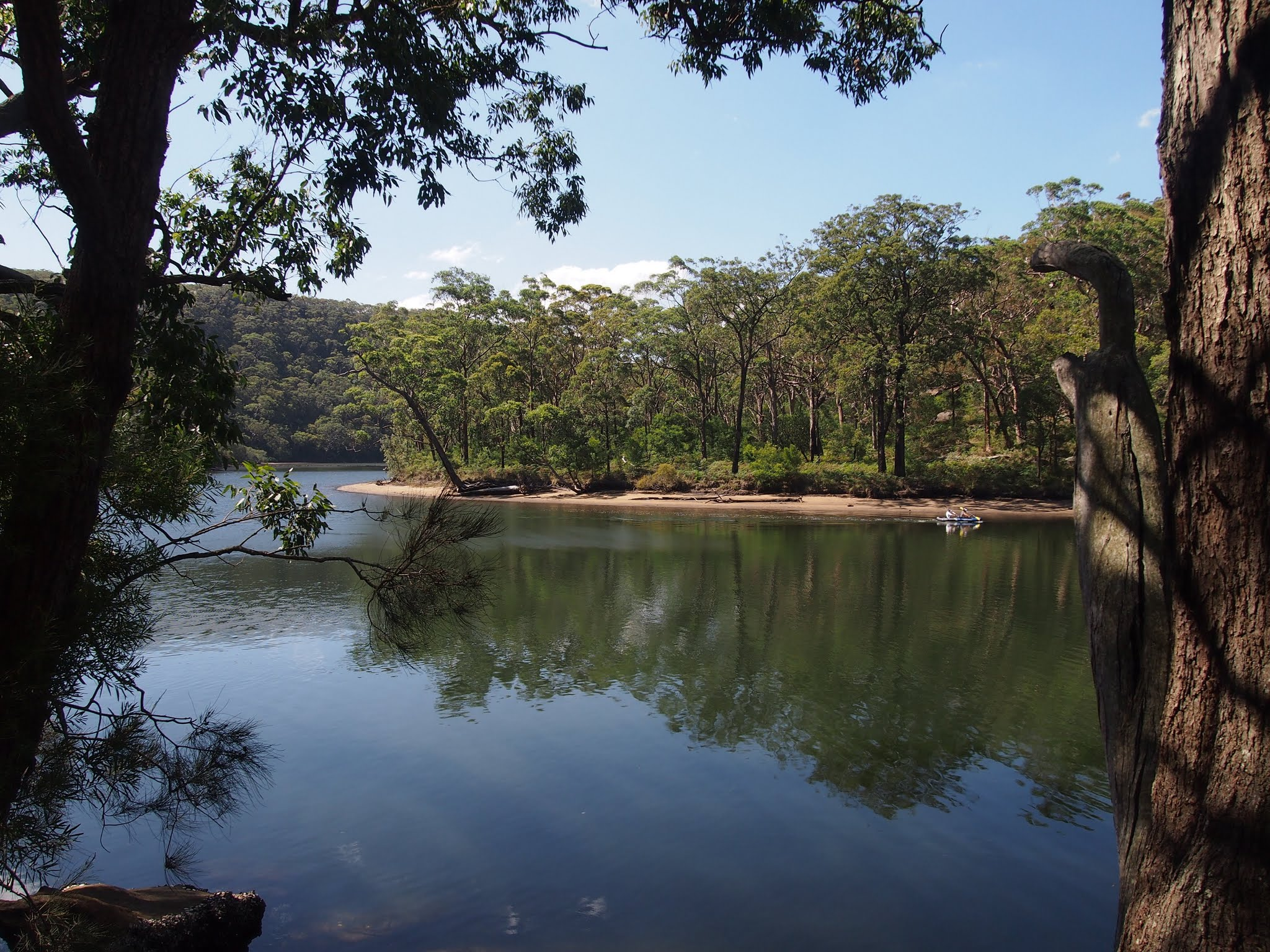
Riverside Drive (#5)

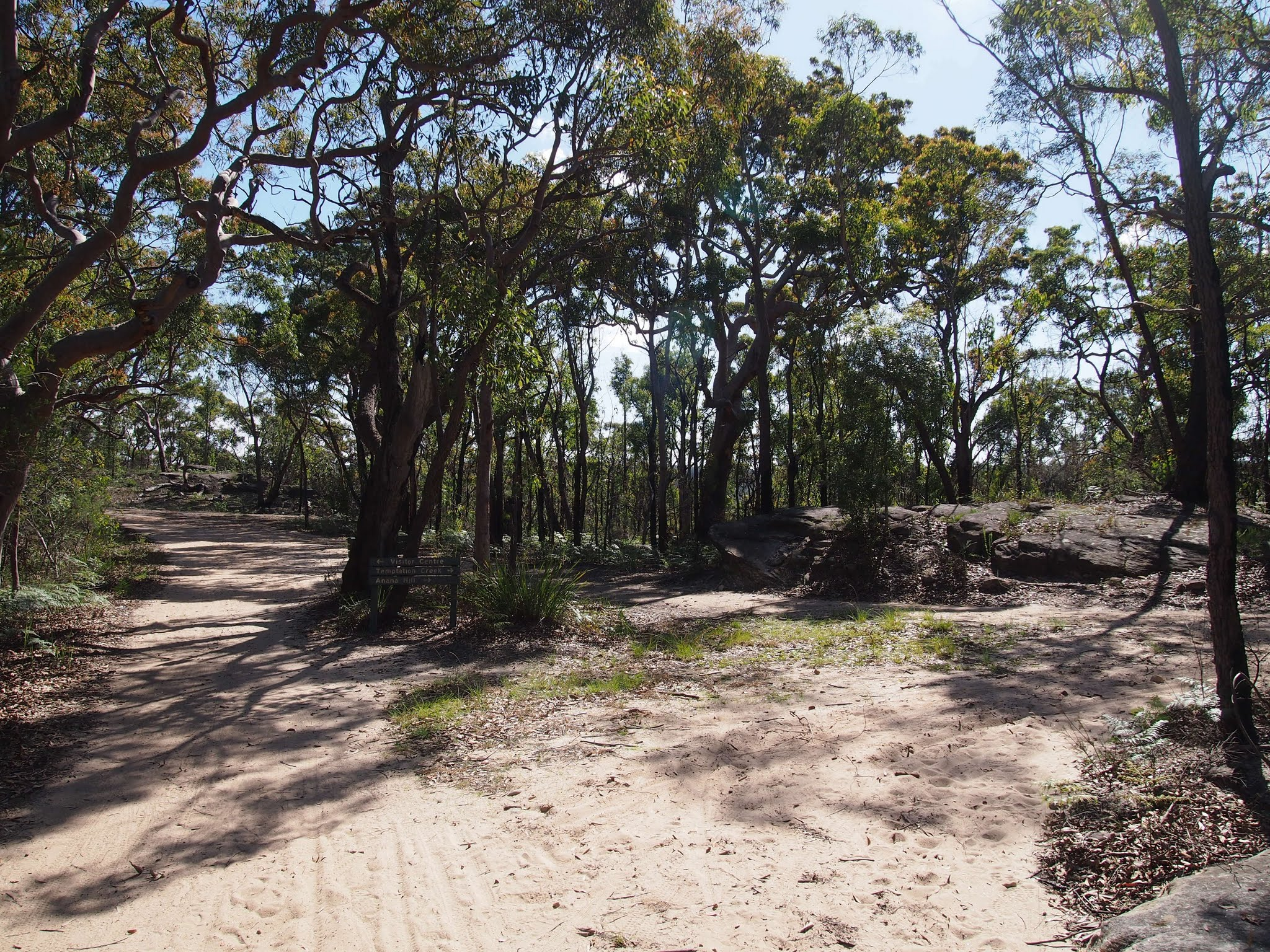
Florence Parade Trail

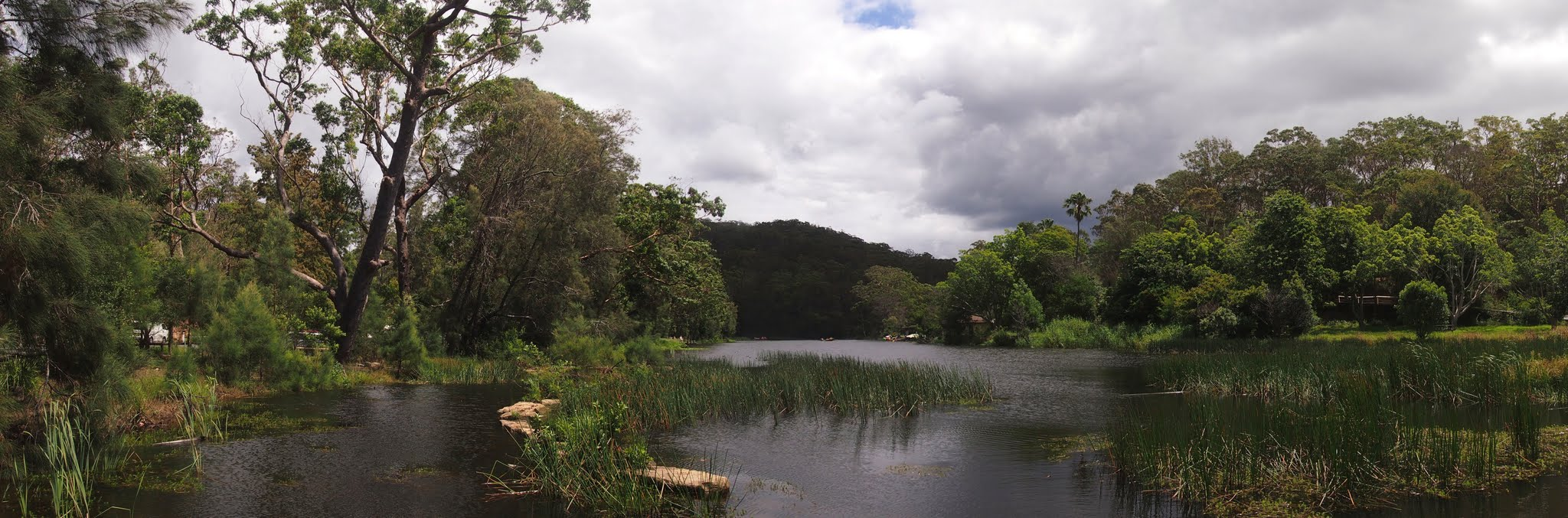
Audley Weir (#1)

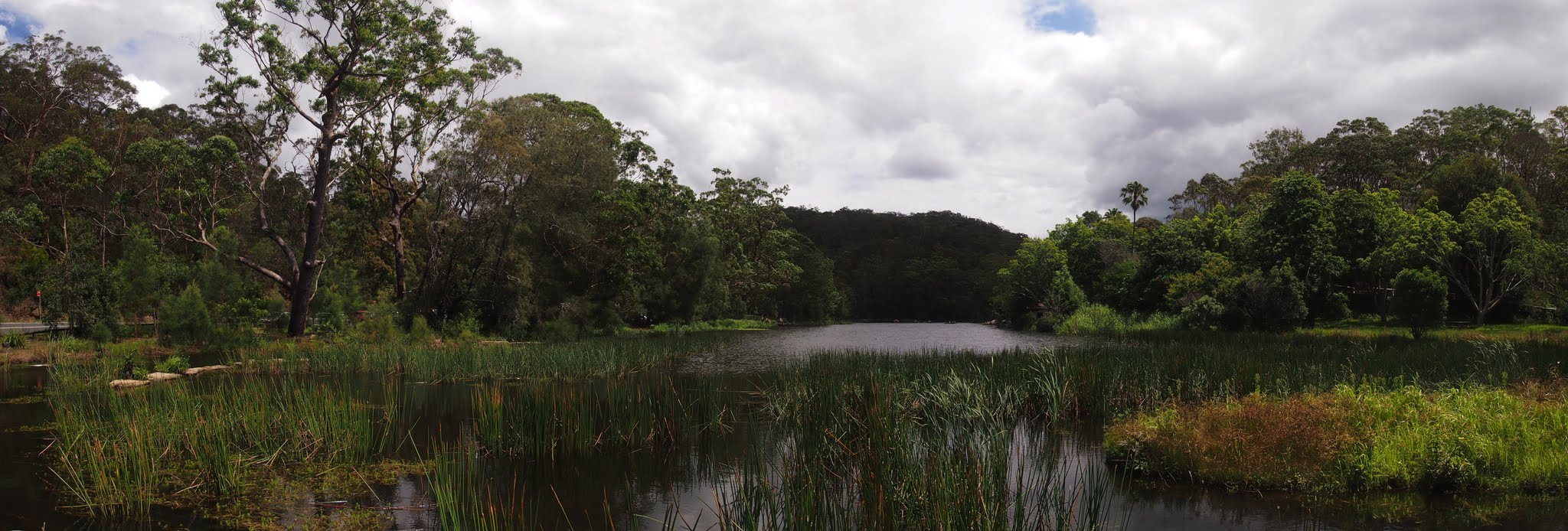
Audley Weir (#2)

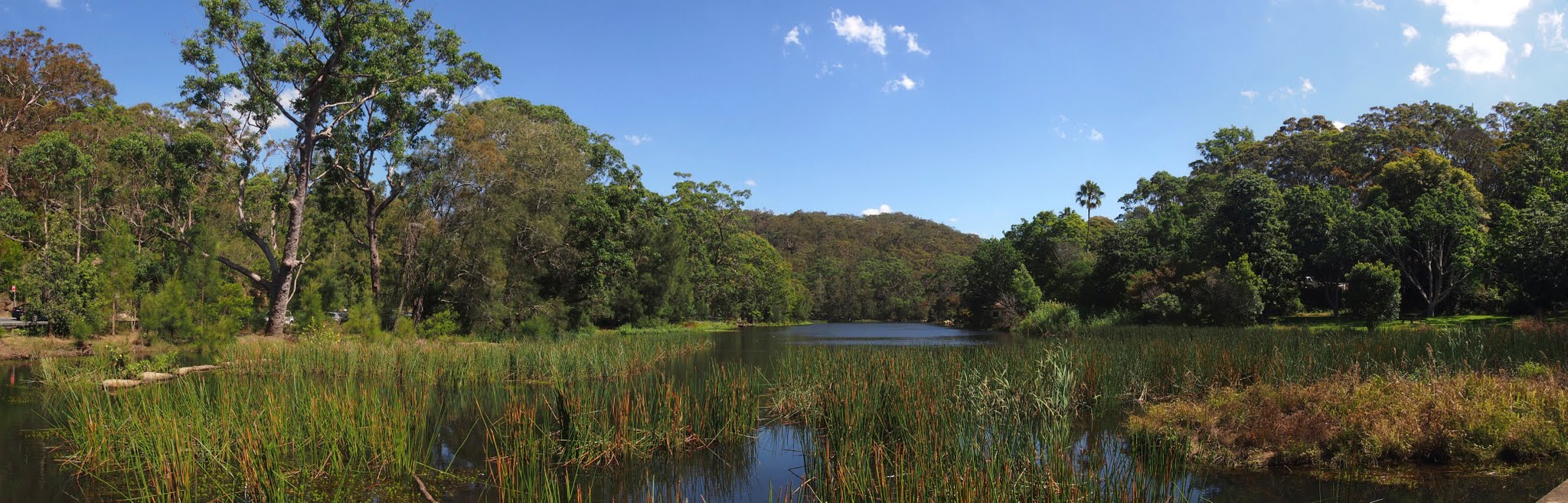
Audley Weir (#3)

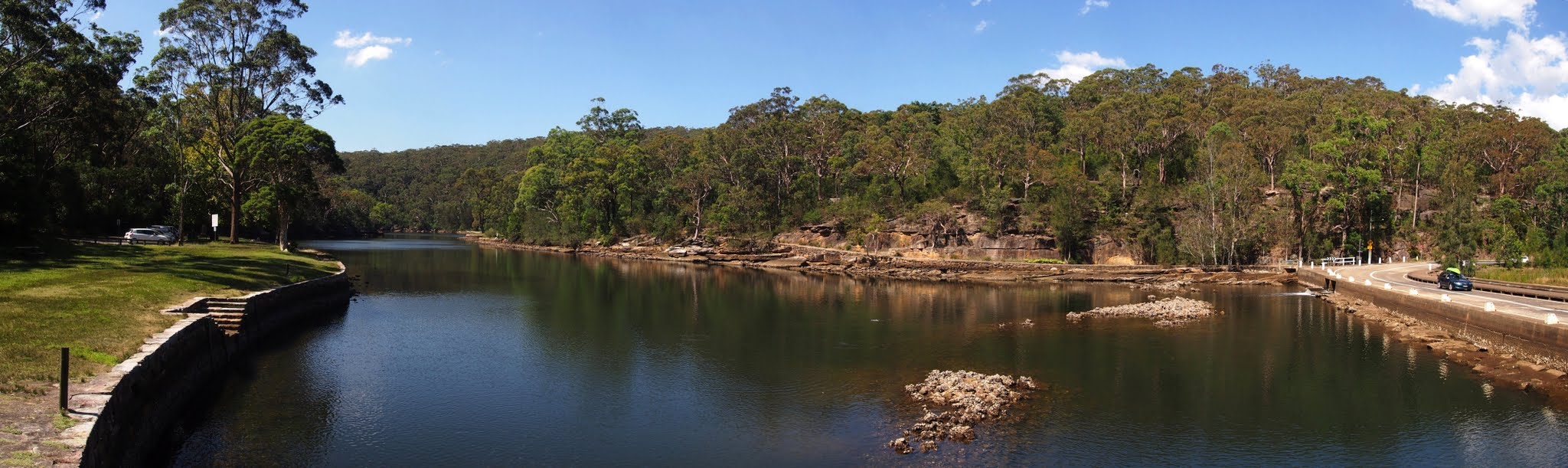
Audley Weir (#4)

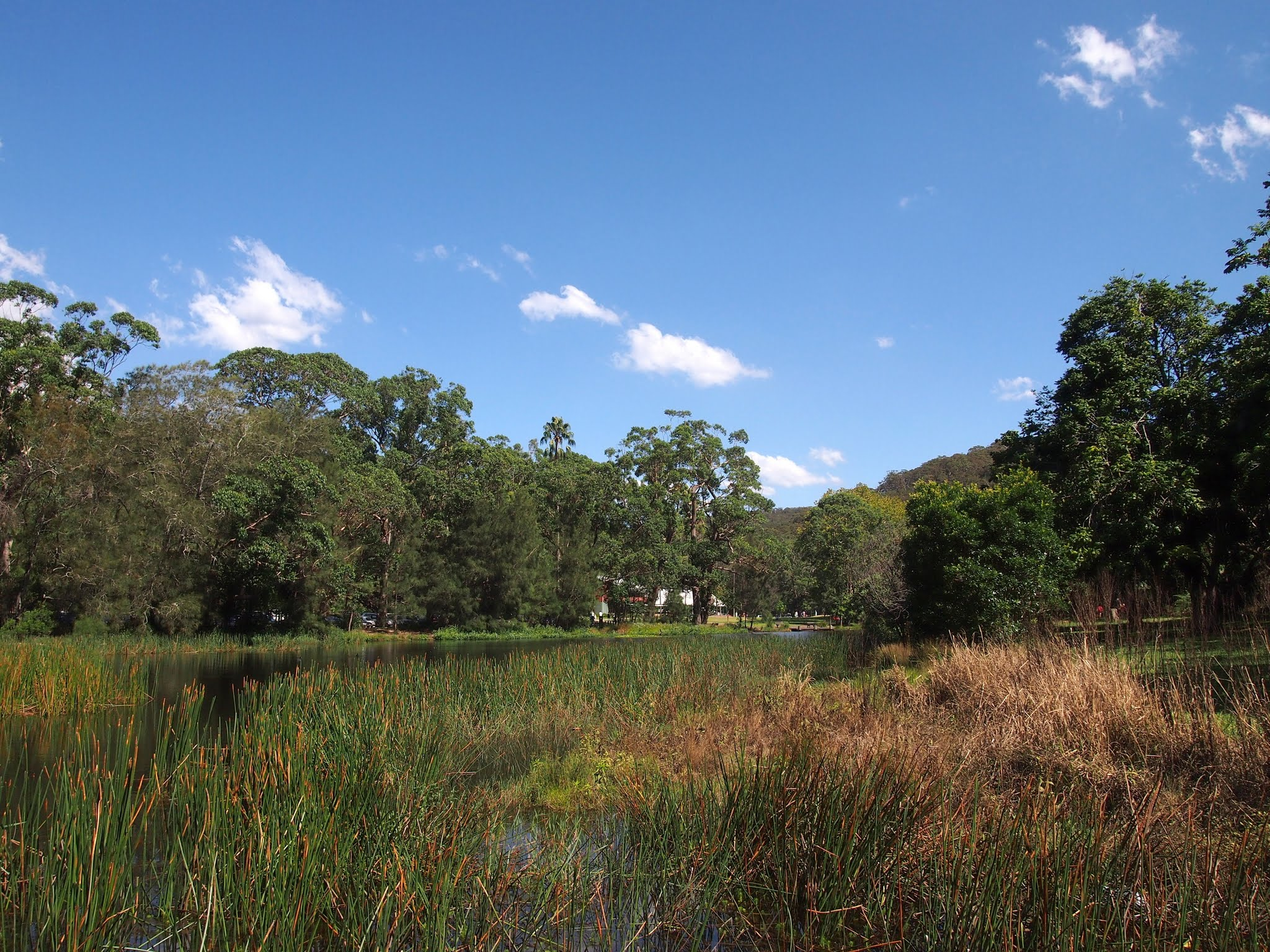
Audley Weir (#5)

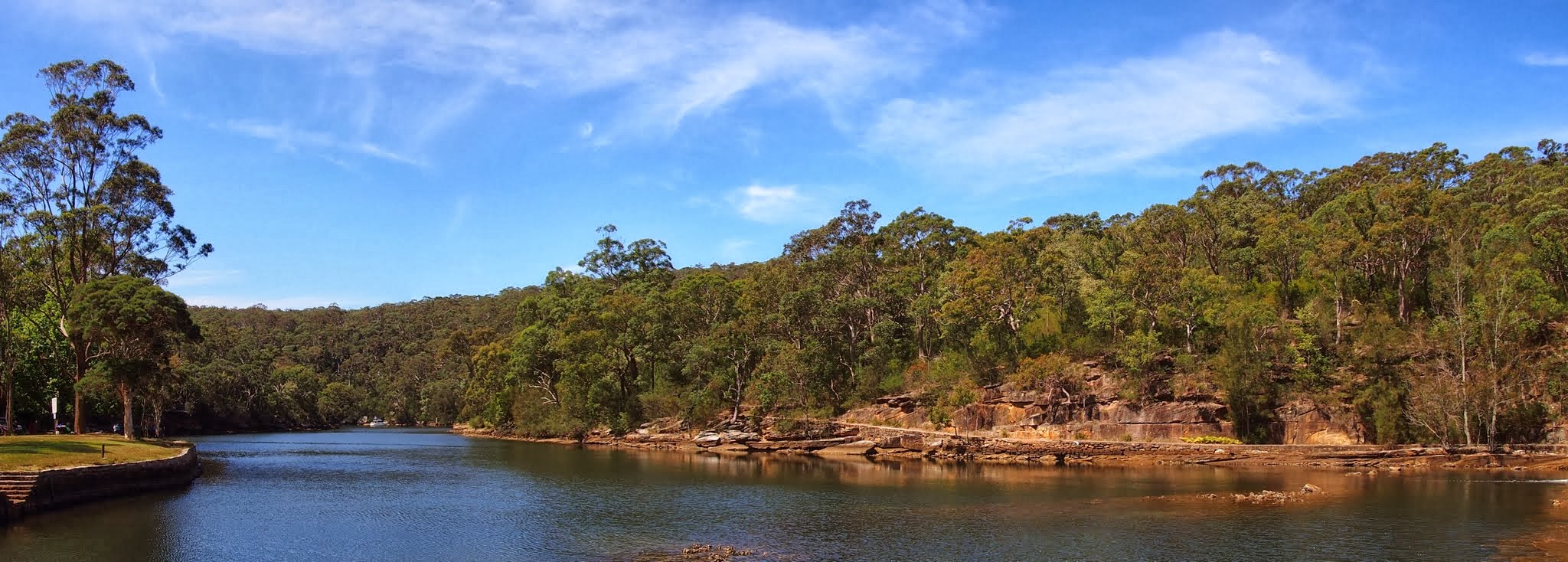
Audley Weir (#6)

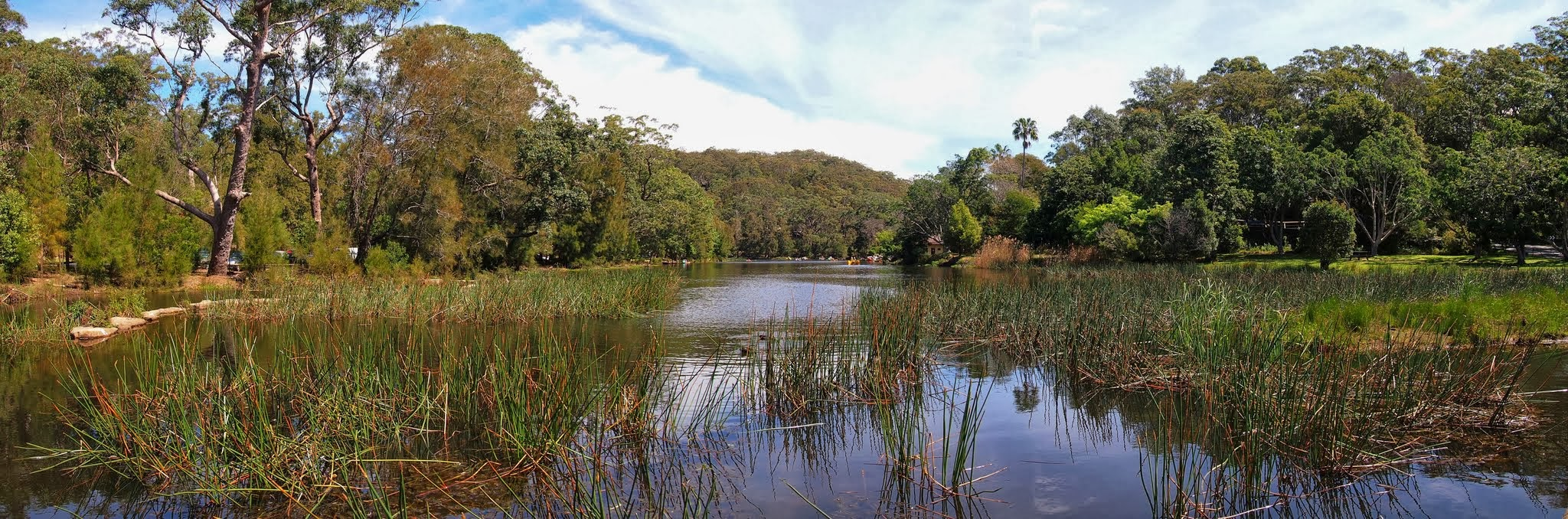
Audley Weir (#7)

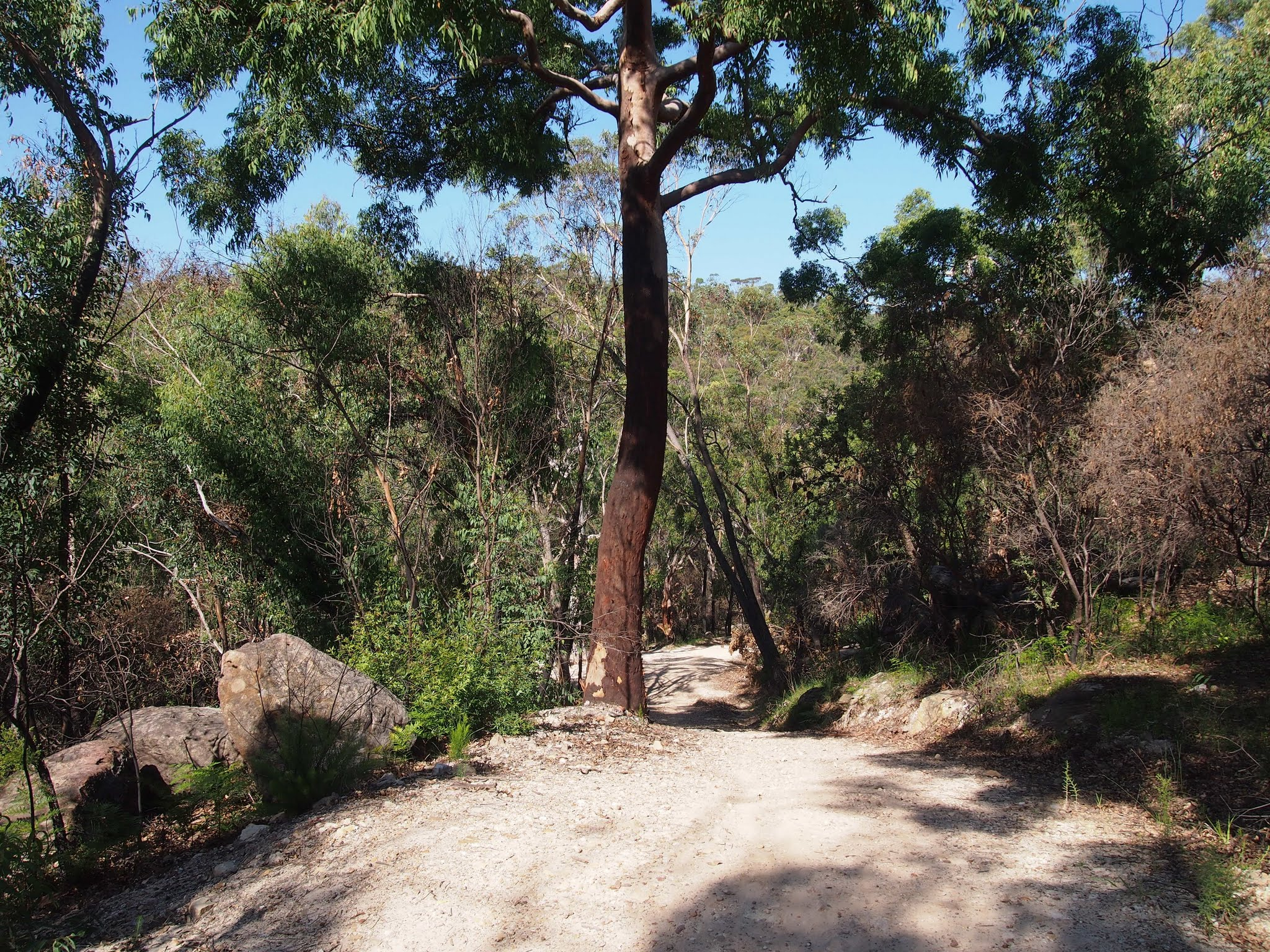
Temptation Creek Trail (#1)

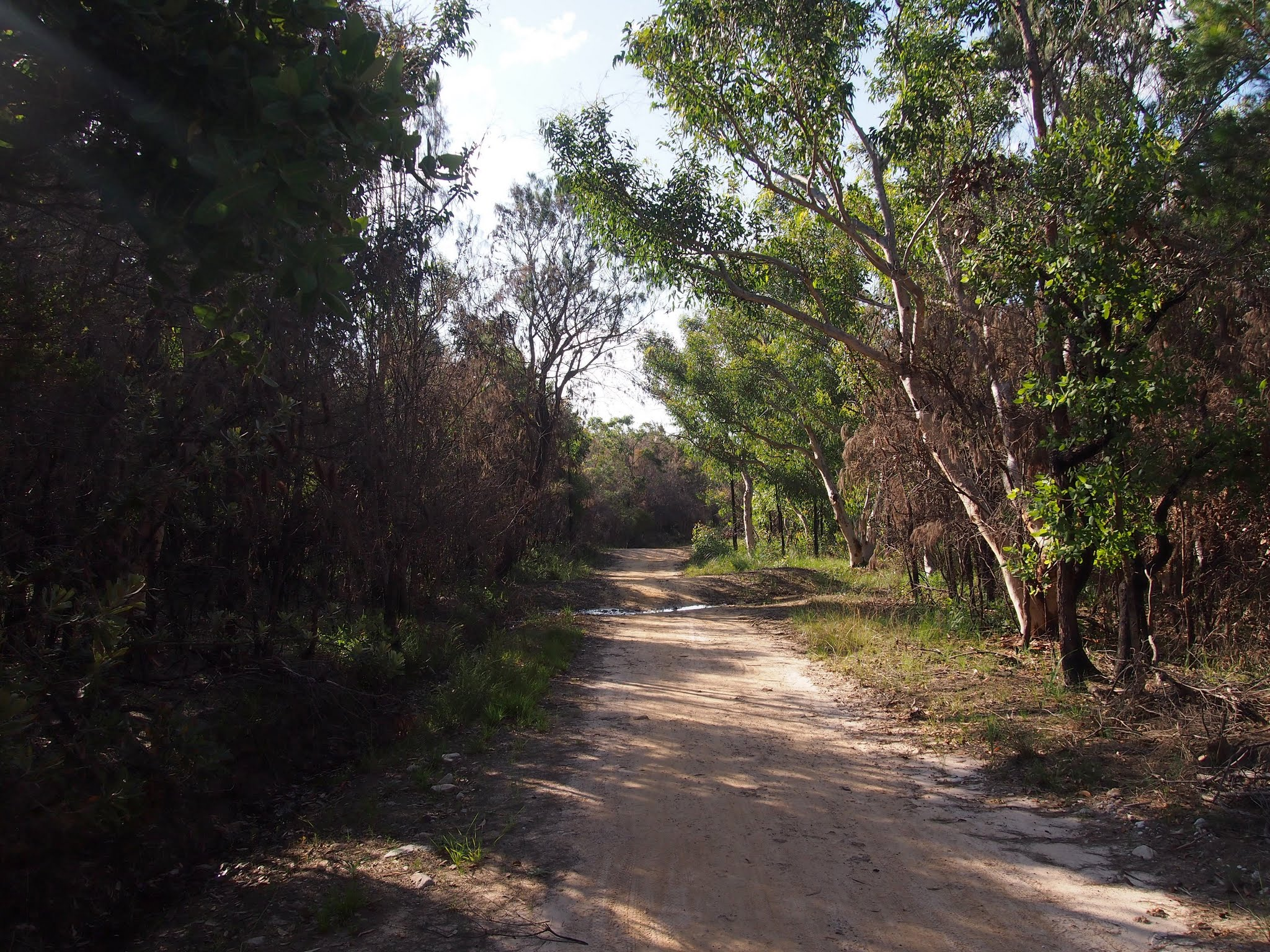
Temptation Creek Trail (#2)

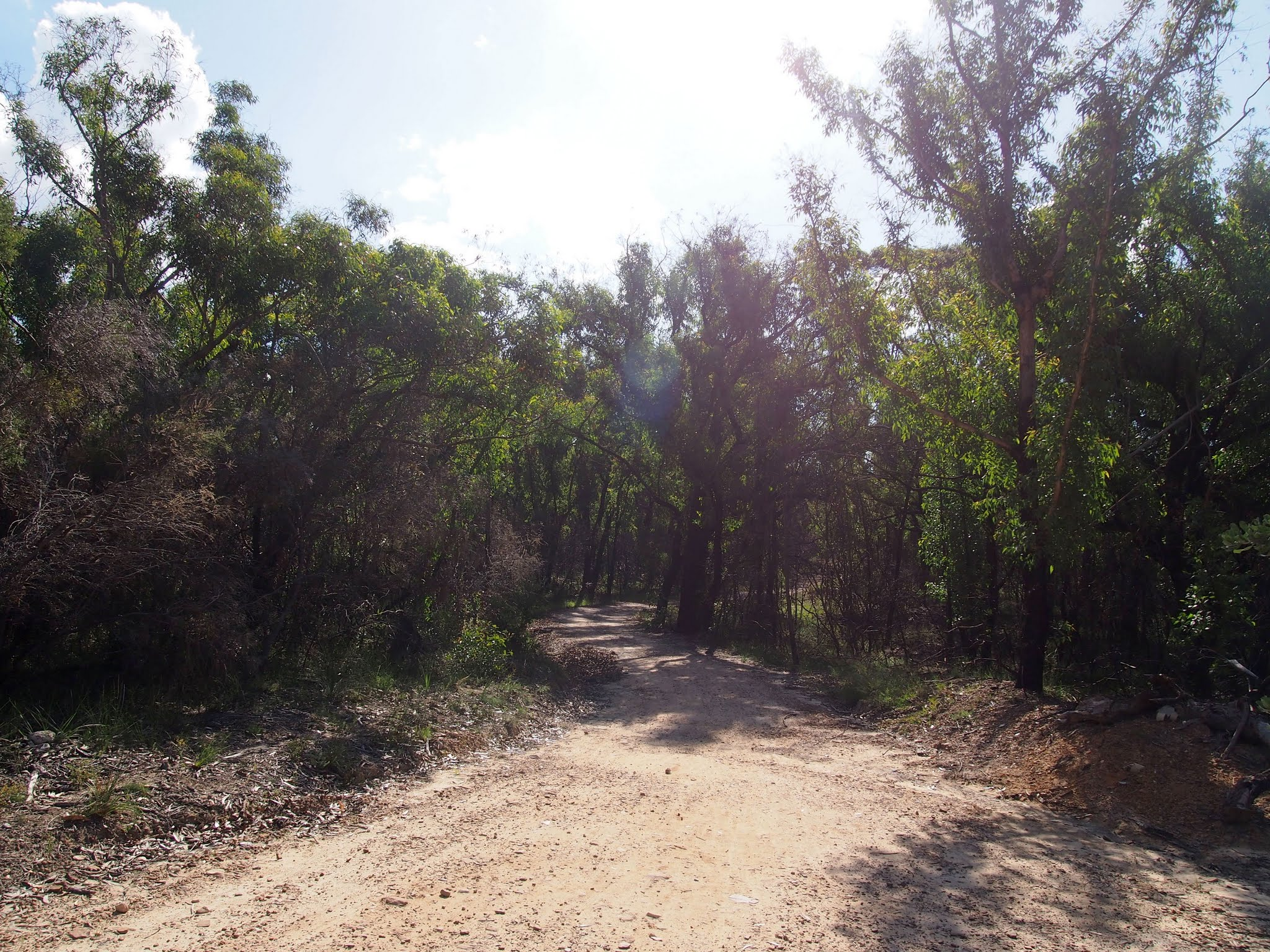
Temptation Creek Trail (#3)

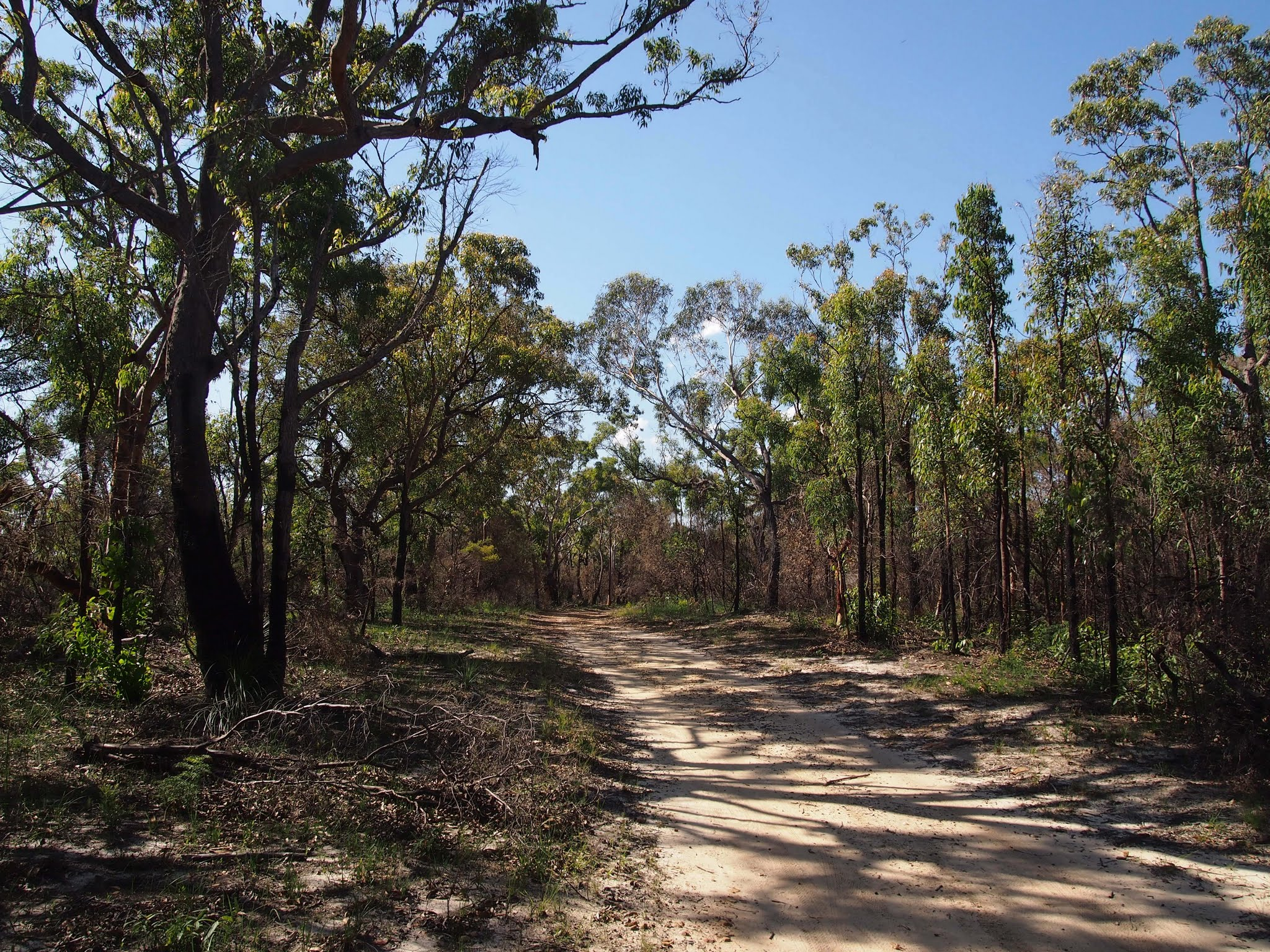
Temptation Creek Trail (#4)

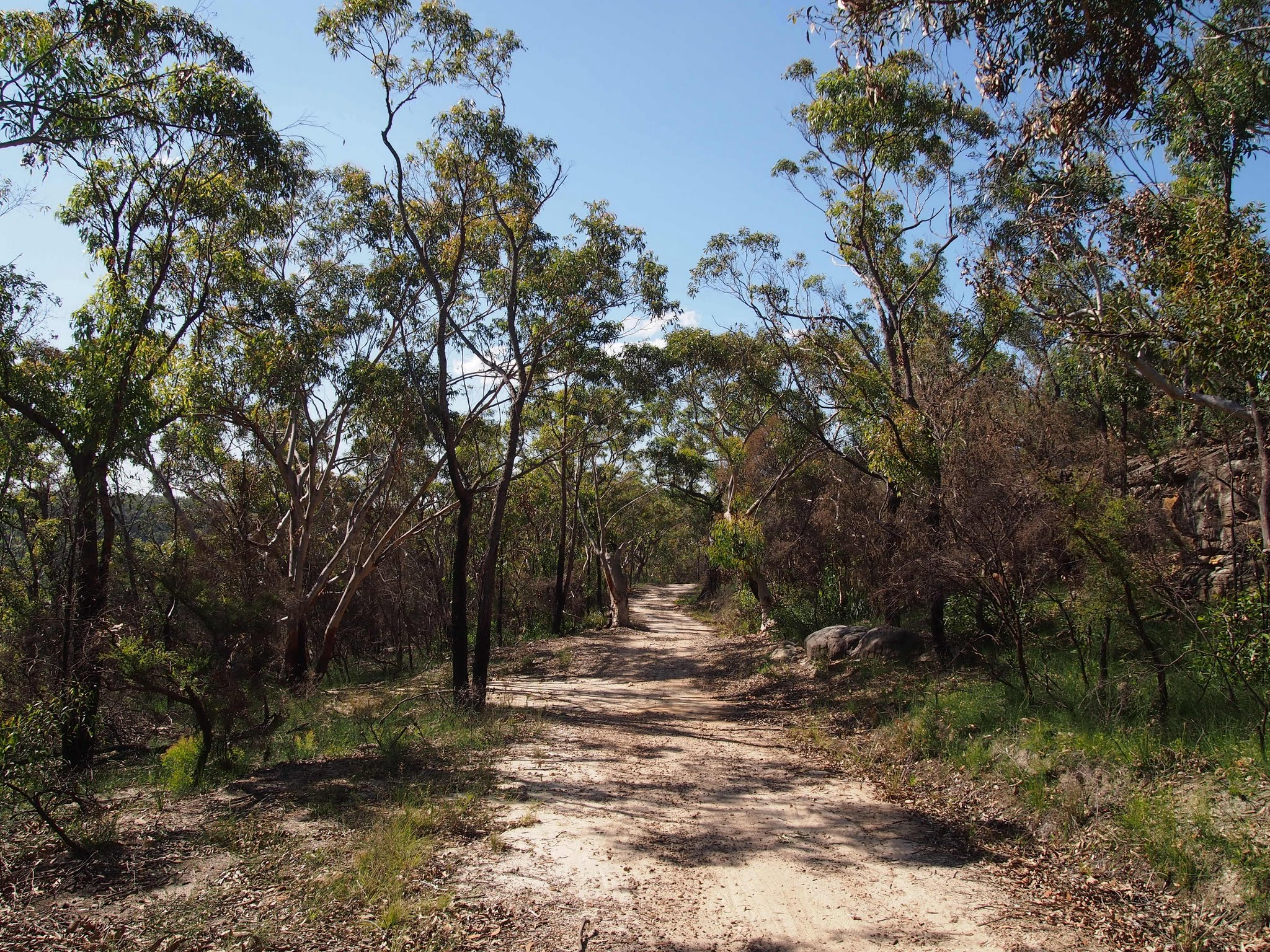
Temptation Creek Trail (#5)

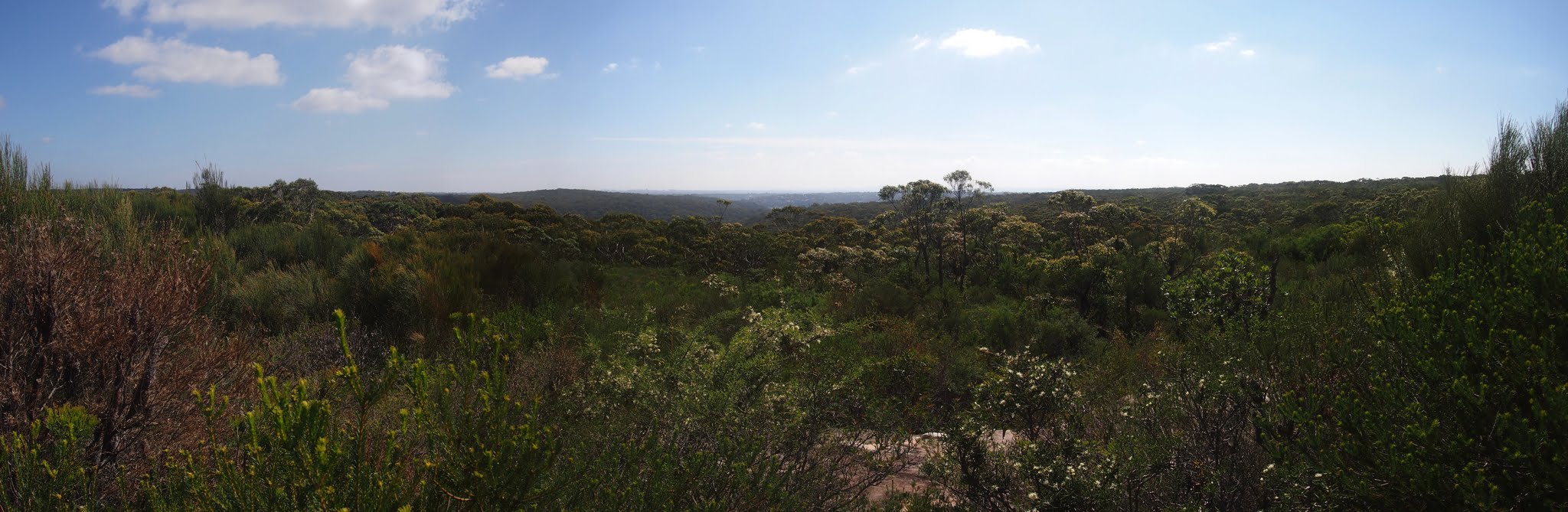
Anice Falls Track (#1)

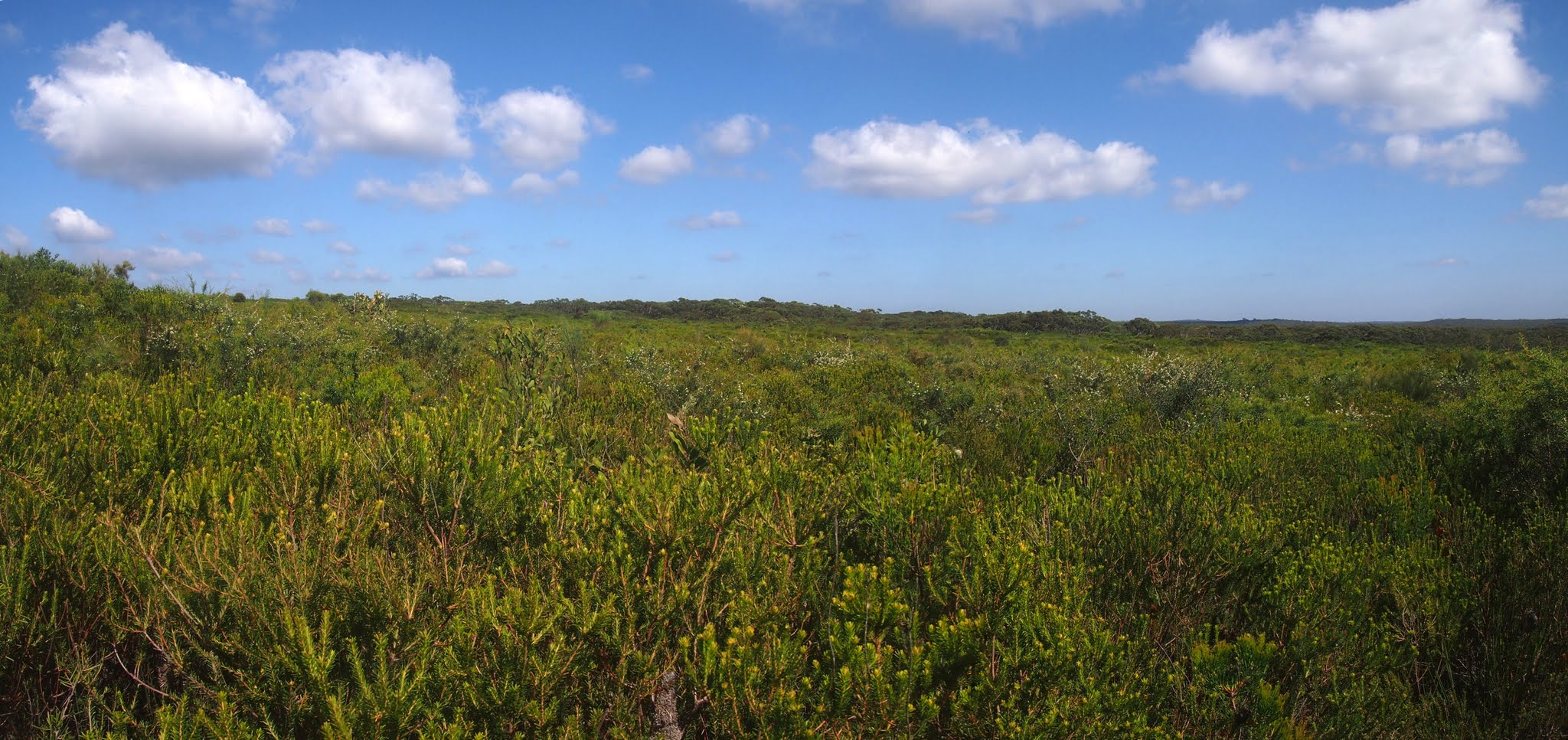
Anice Falls Track (#2)

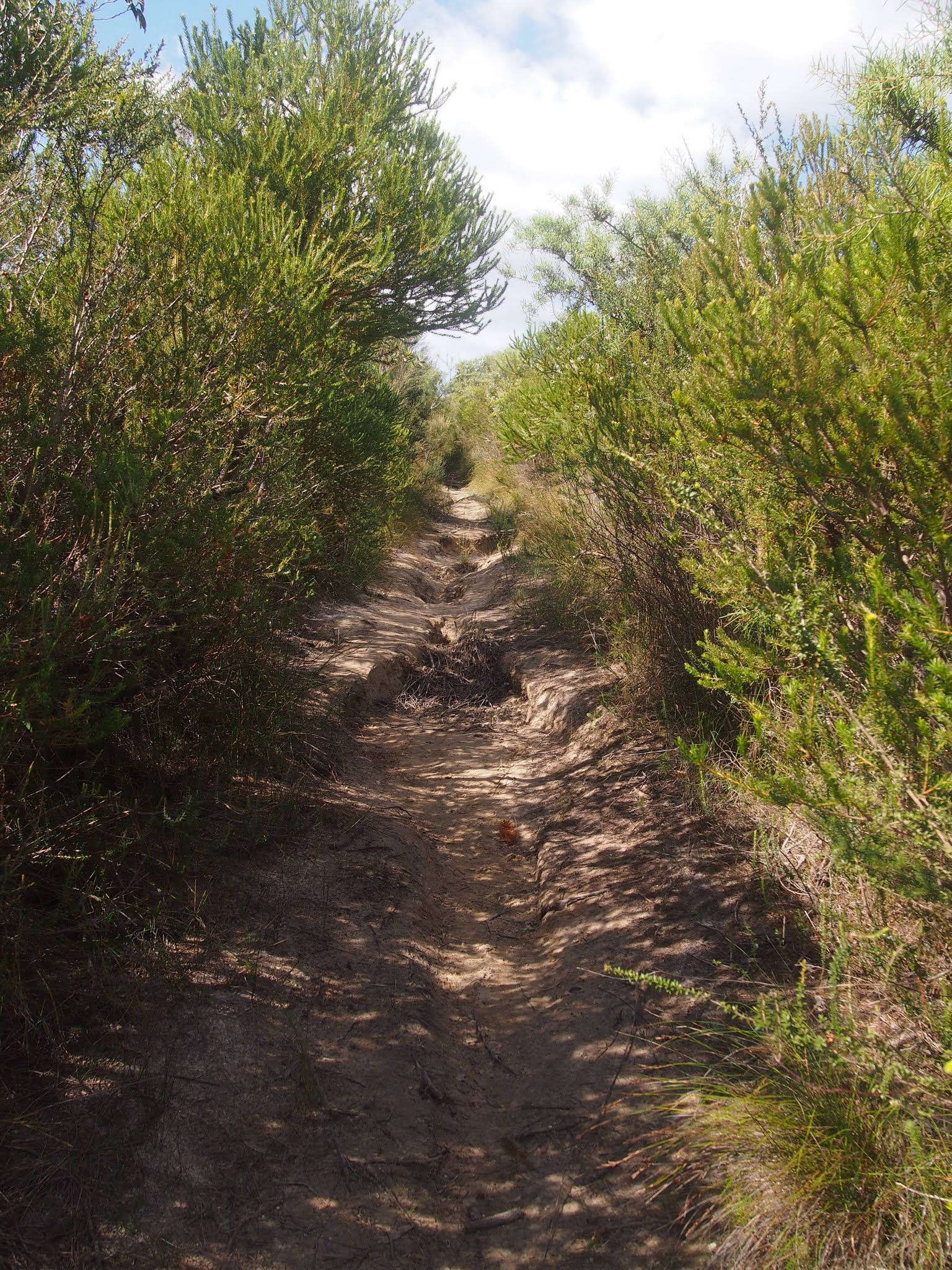
Anice Falls Track (#3)

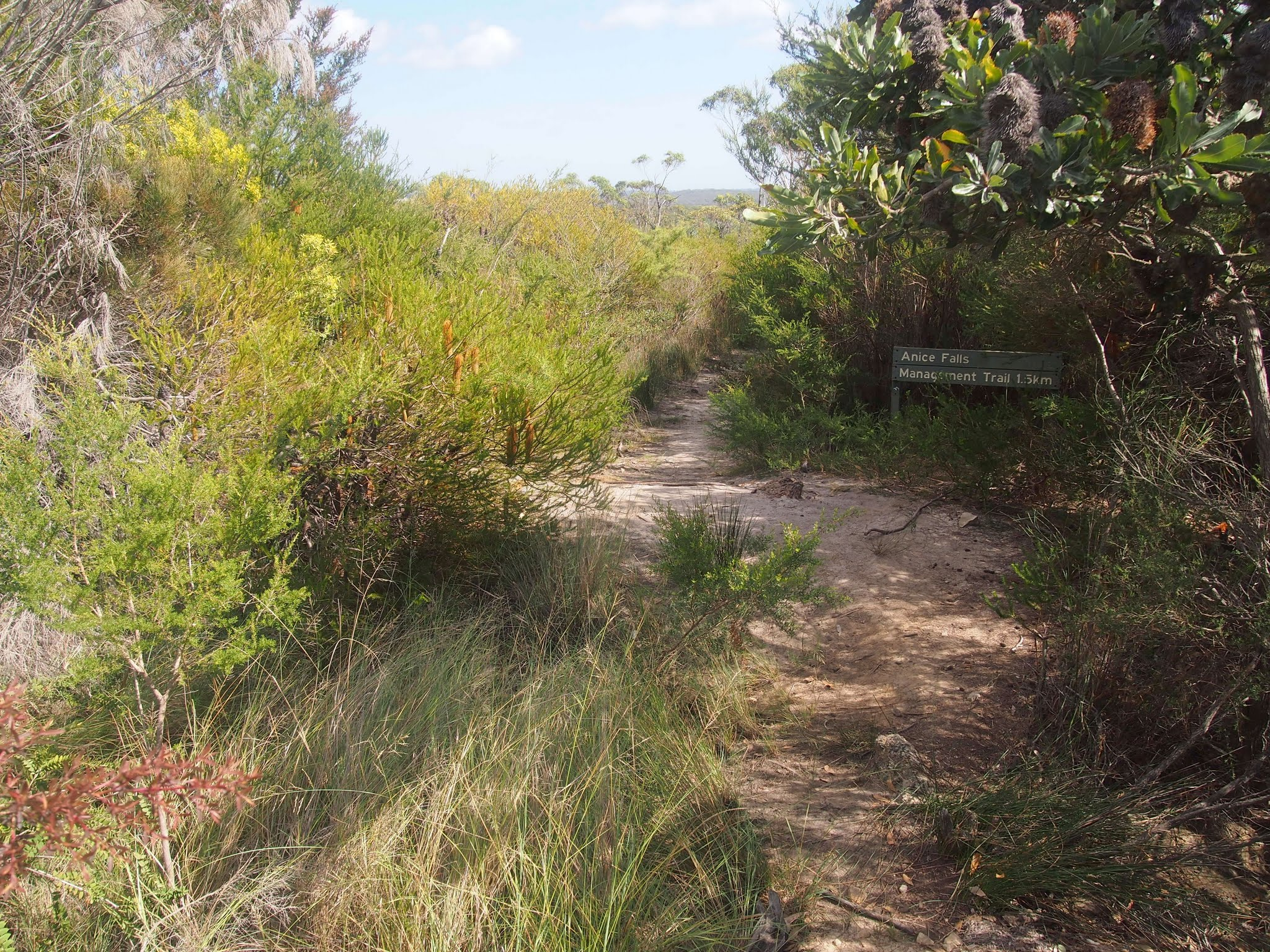
Anice Falls Track (#4)

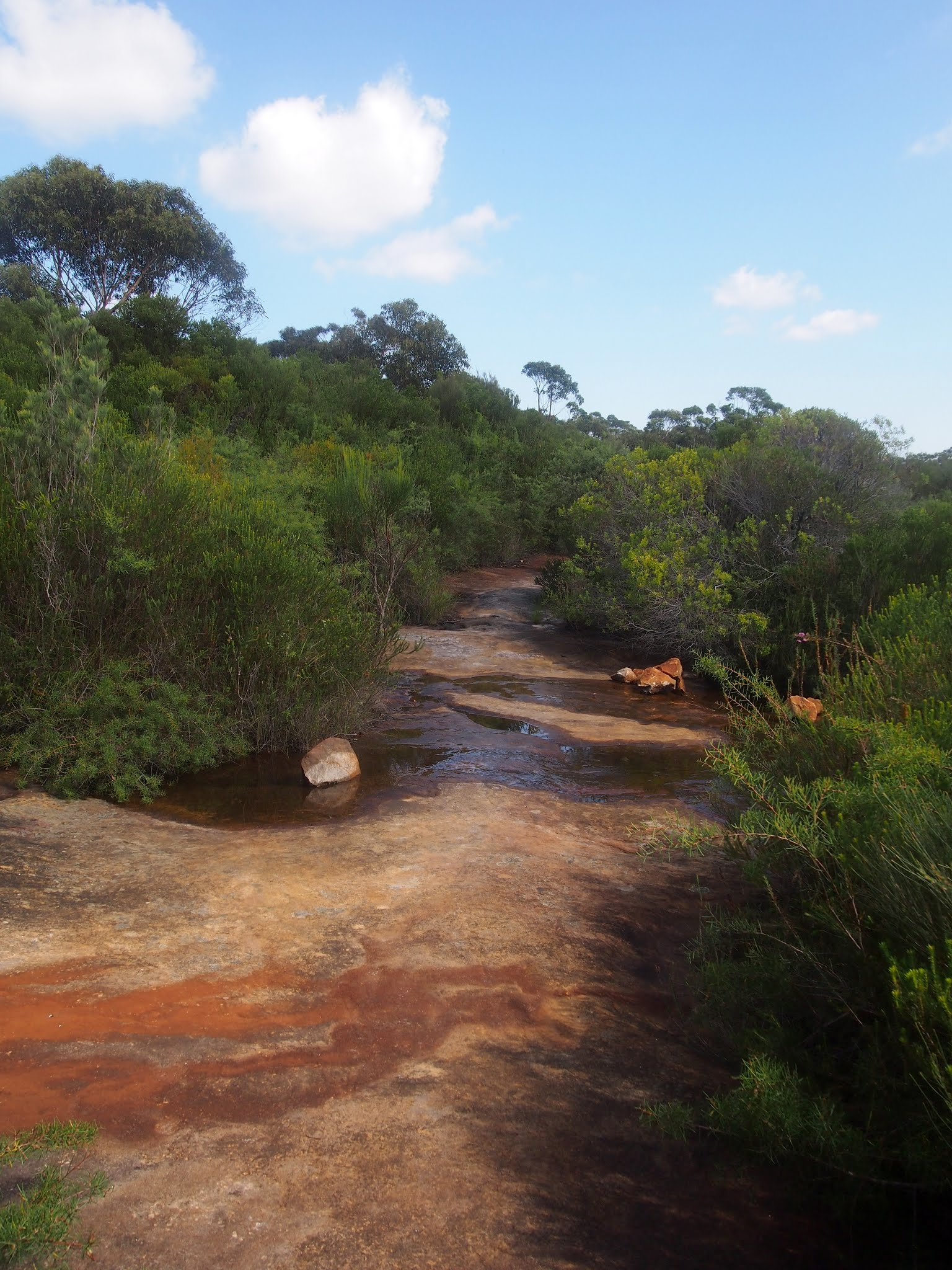
Anice Falls Track (#5)

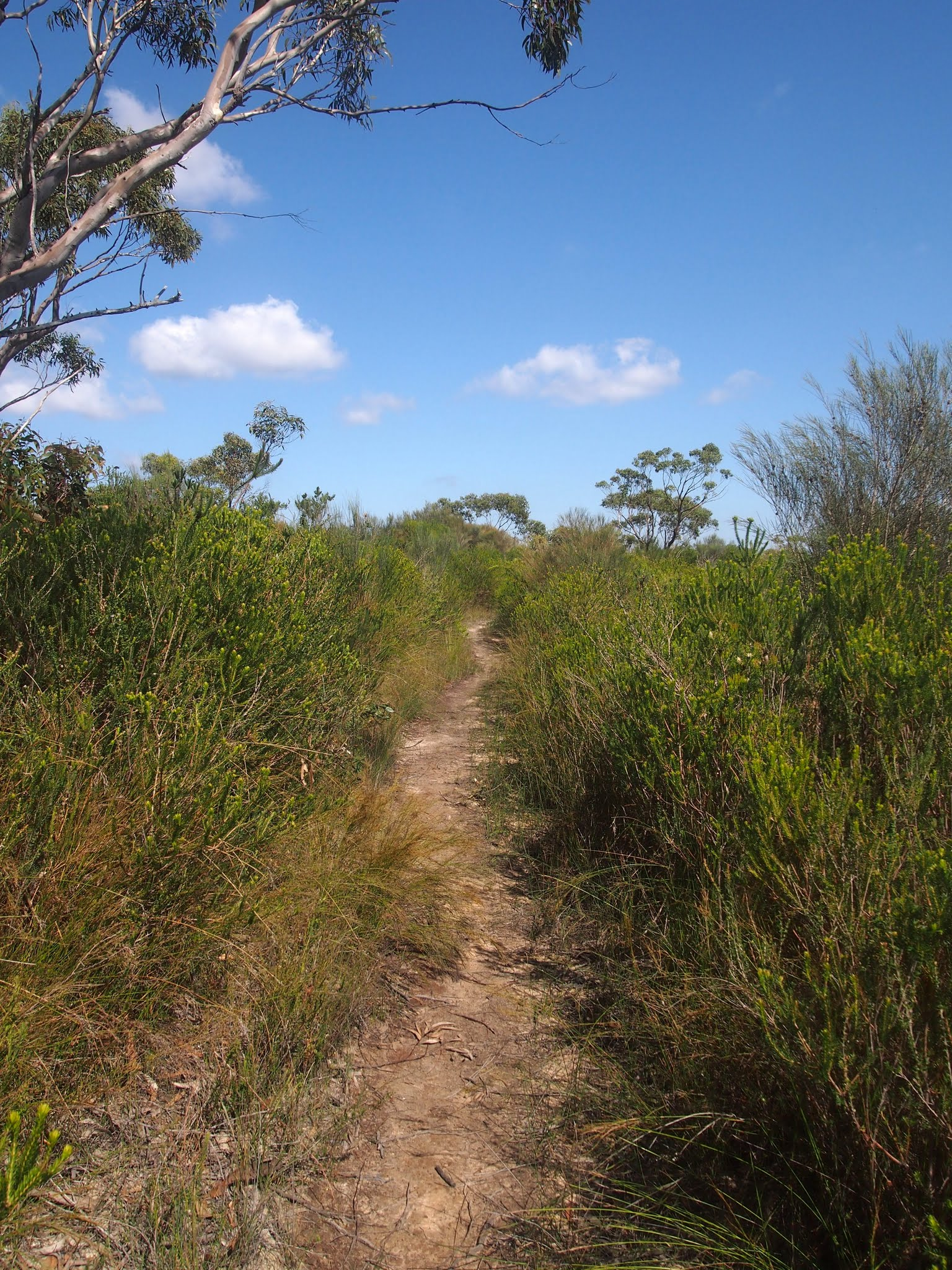
Anice Falls Track (#6)

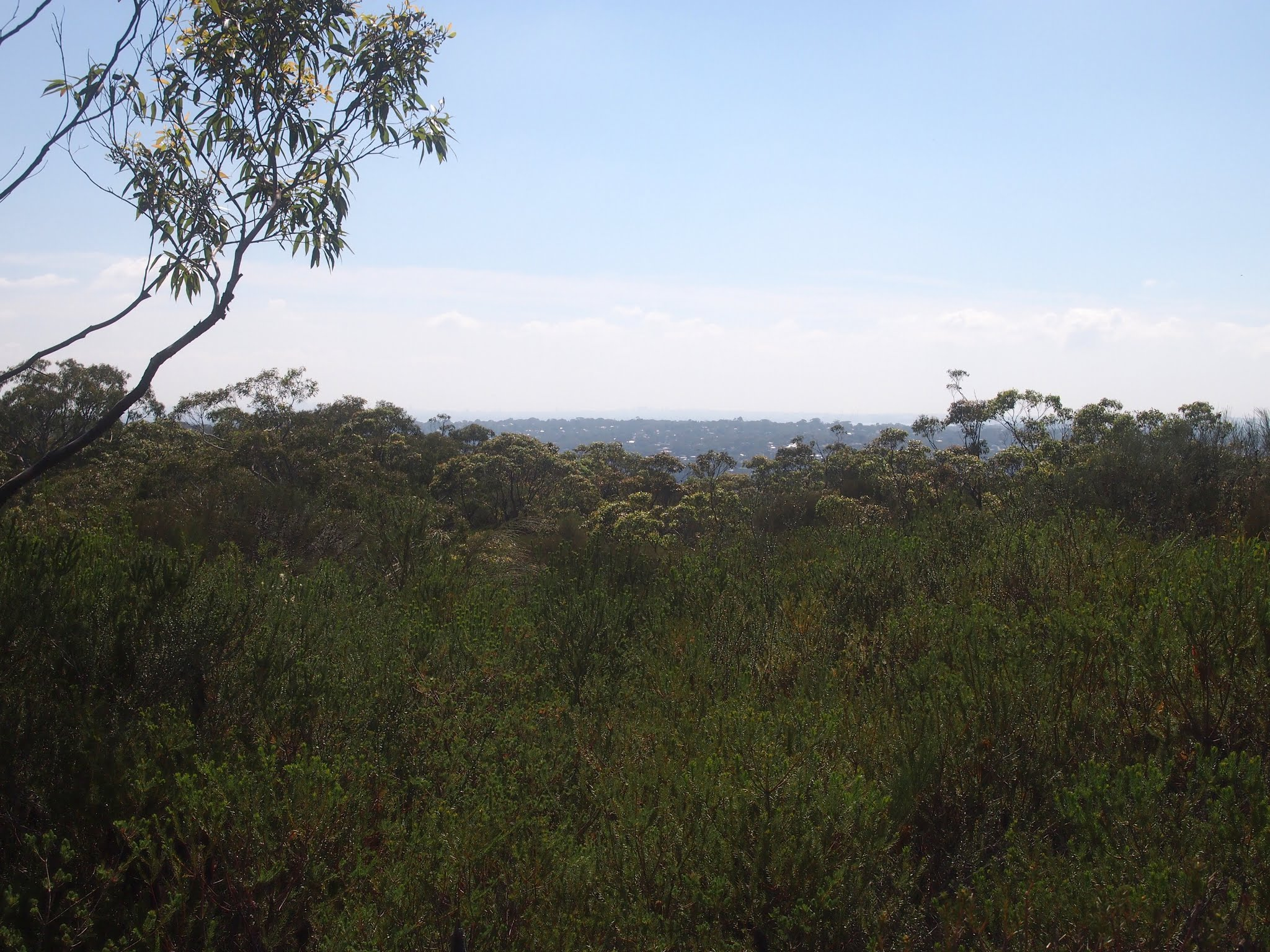
Anice Falls Track (#7)

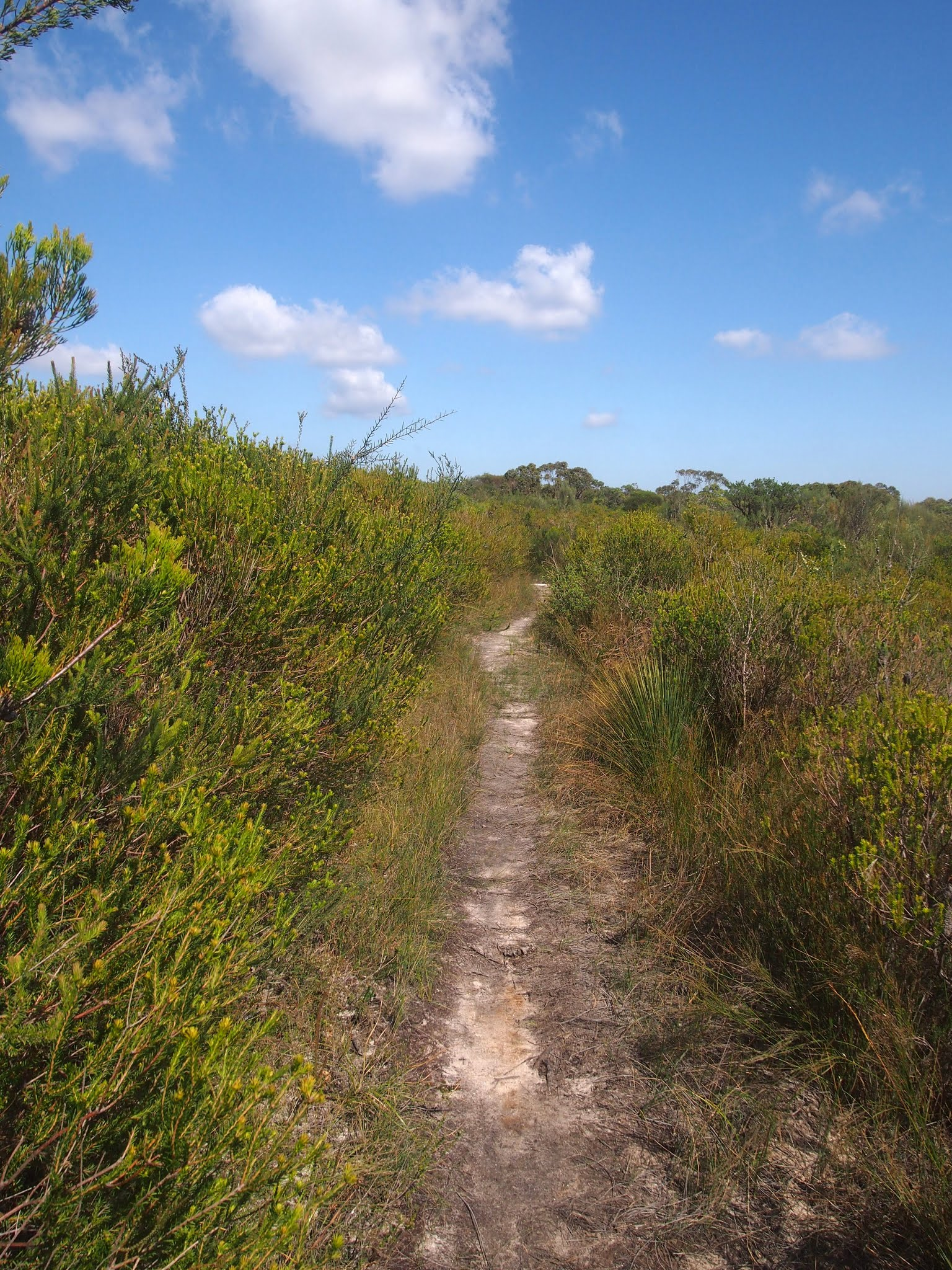
Anice Falls Track (#8)

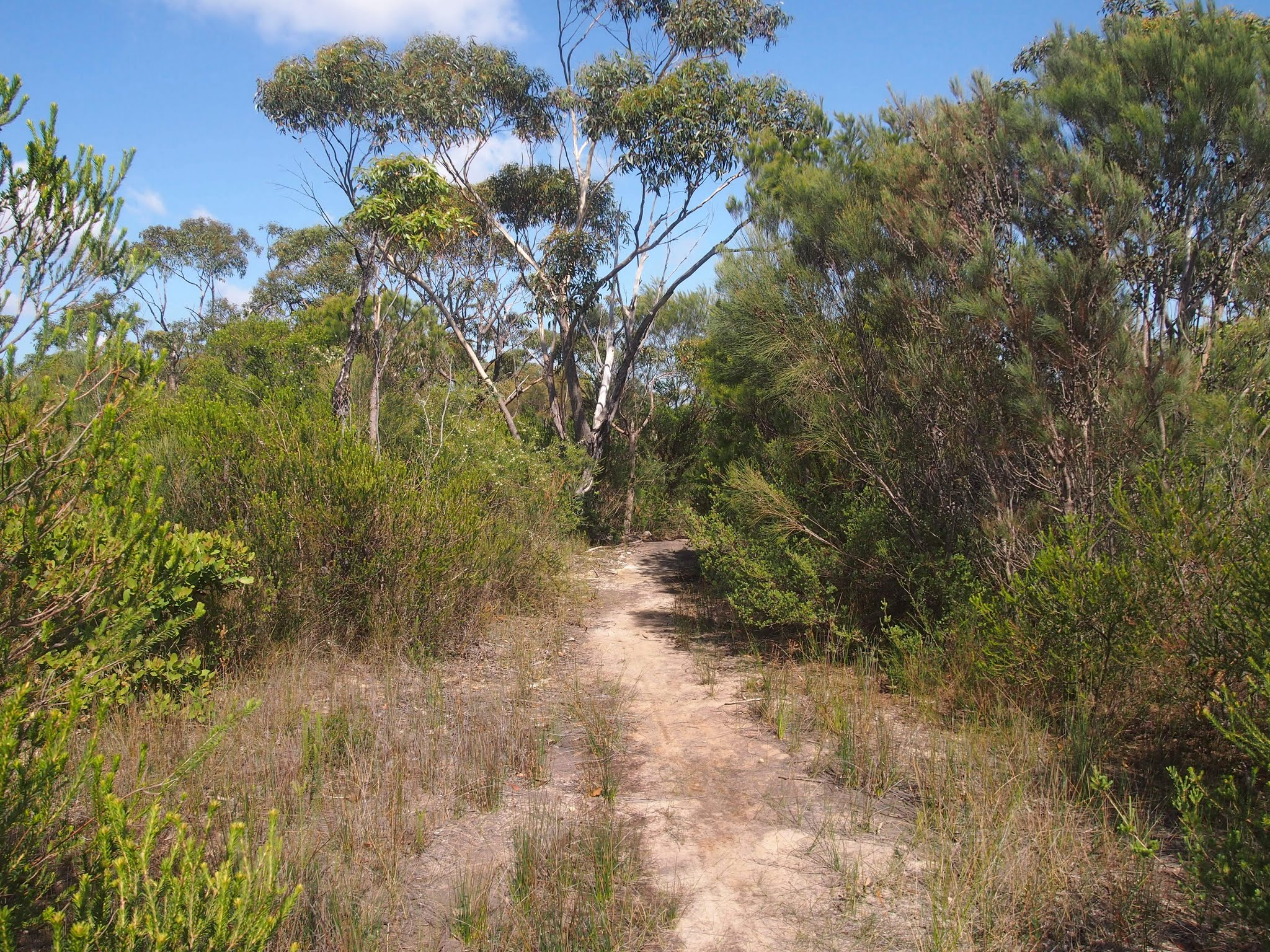
Anice Falls Track (#9)

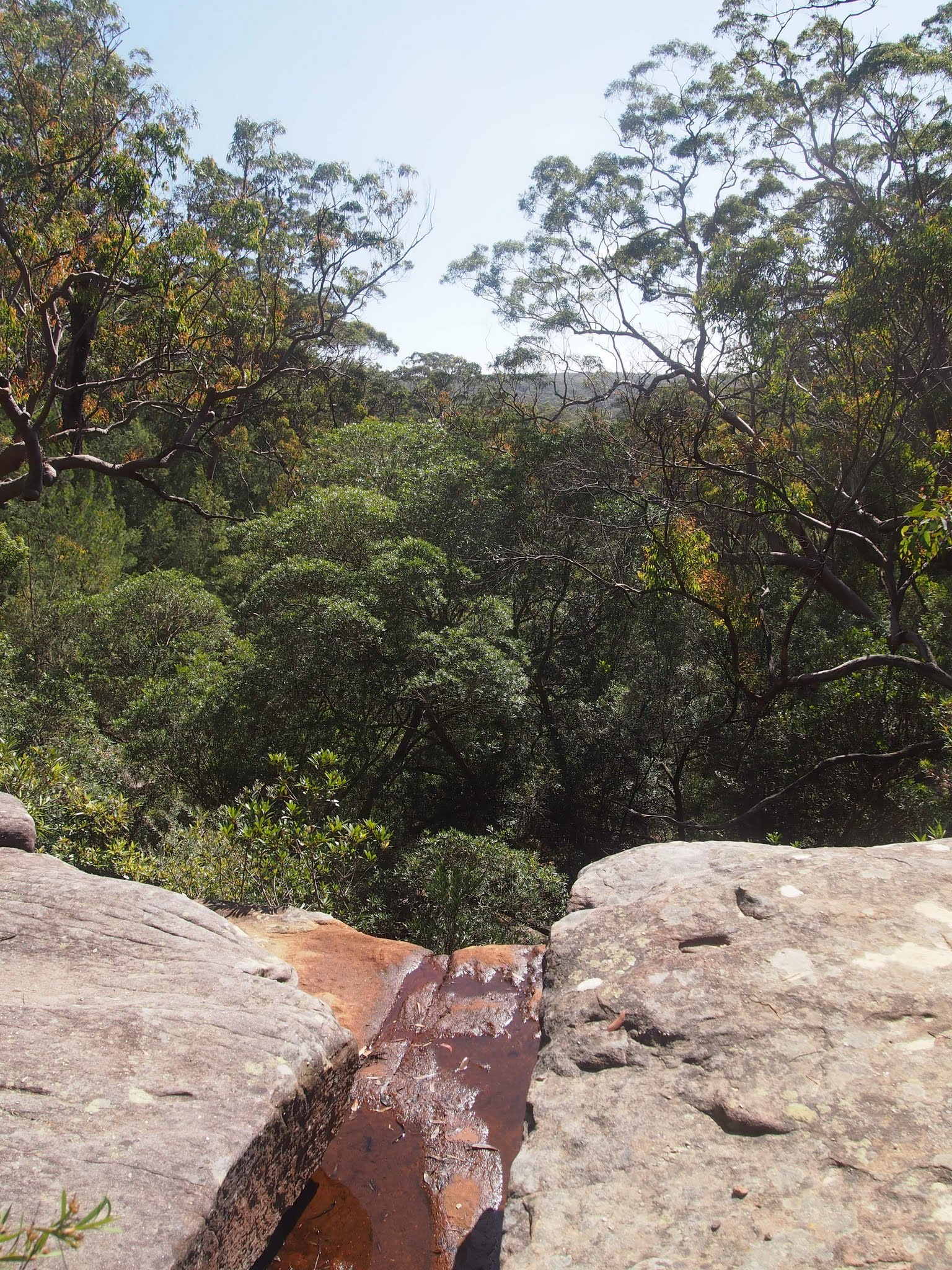
Anice Falls (#1)

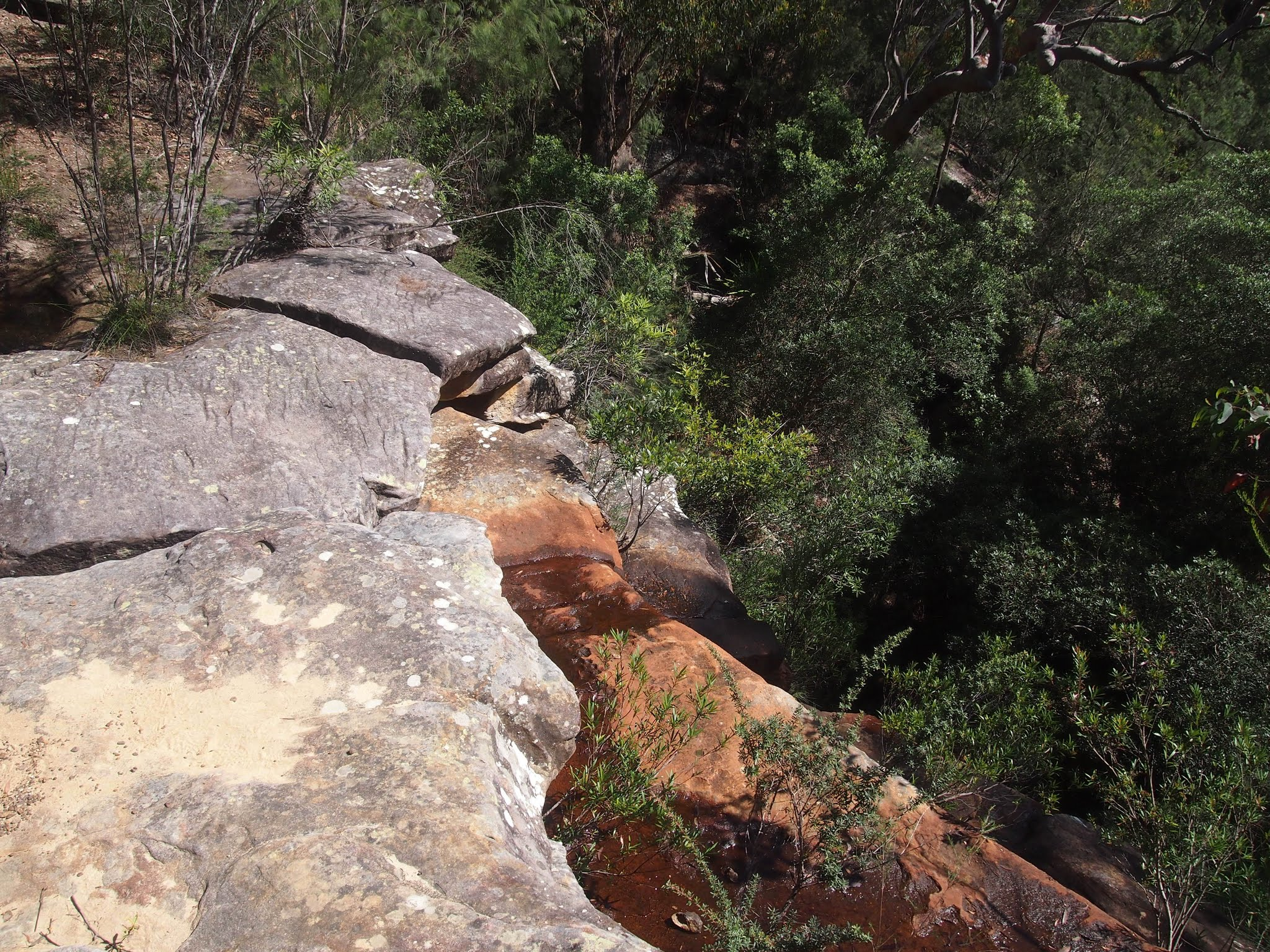
Anice Falls (#2)

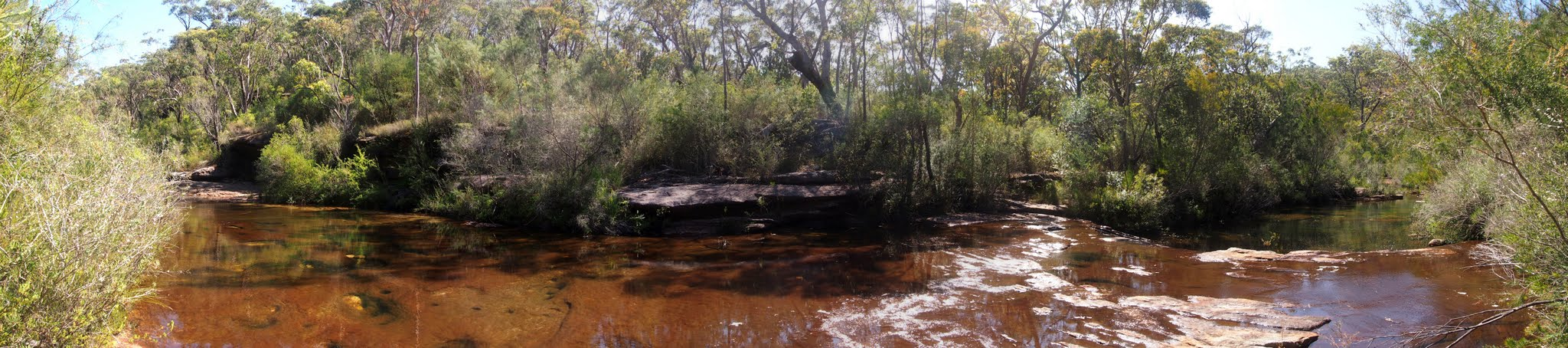
Winifred Falls Track (#1)

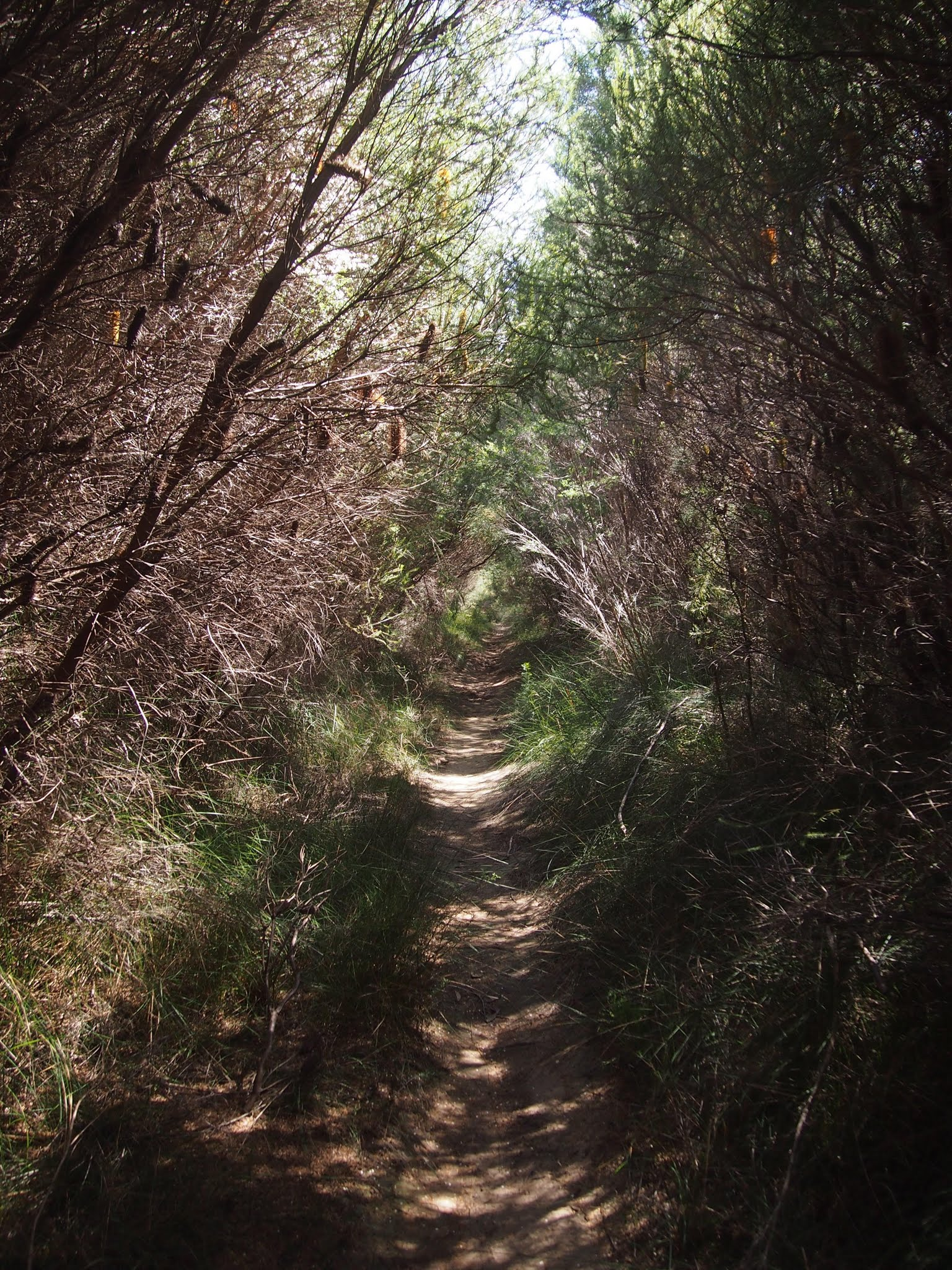
Winifred Falls Track (#2)

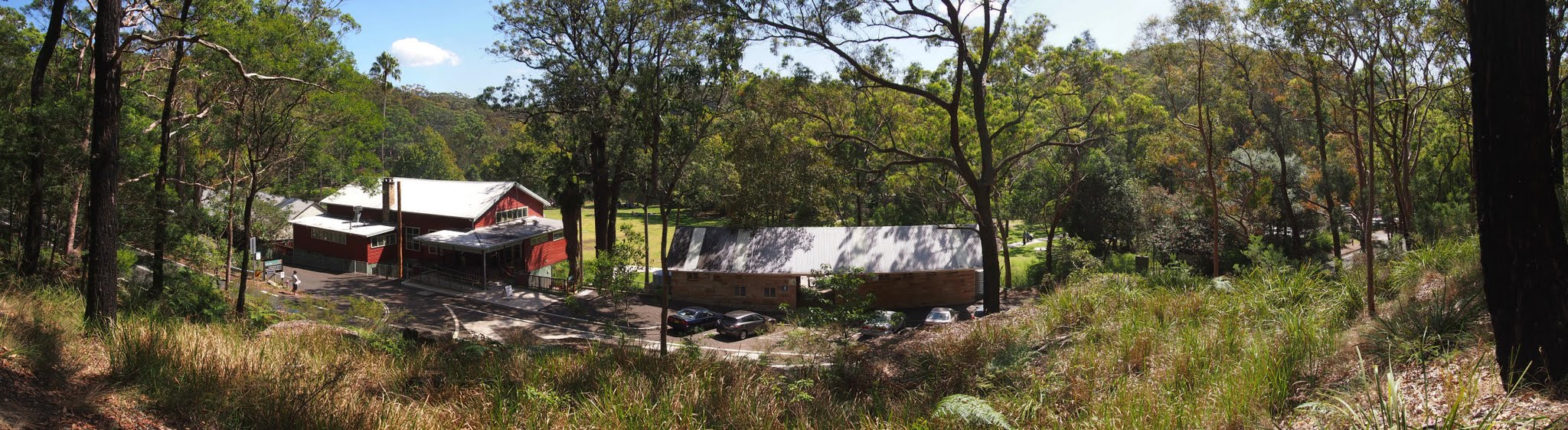
Winifred Falls Track (#3)

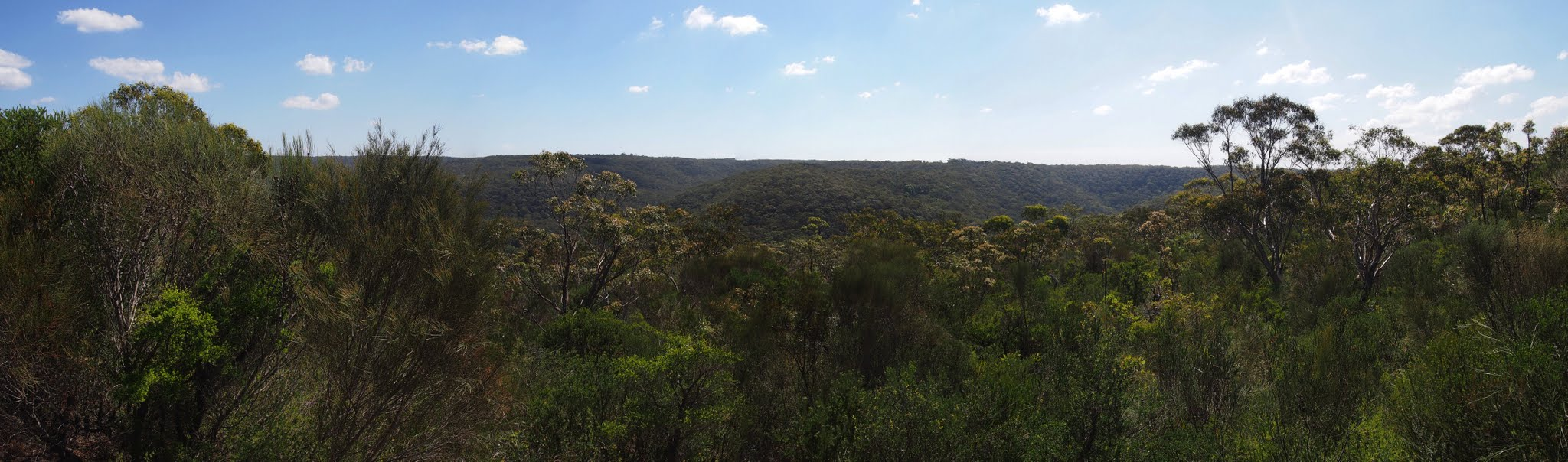
Winifred Falls Track (#4)

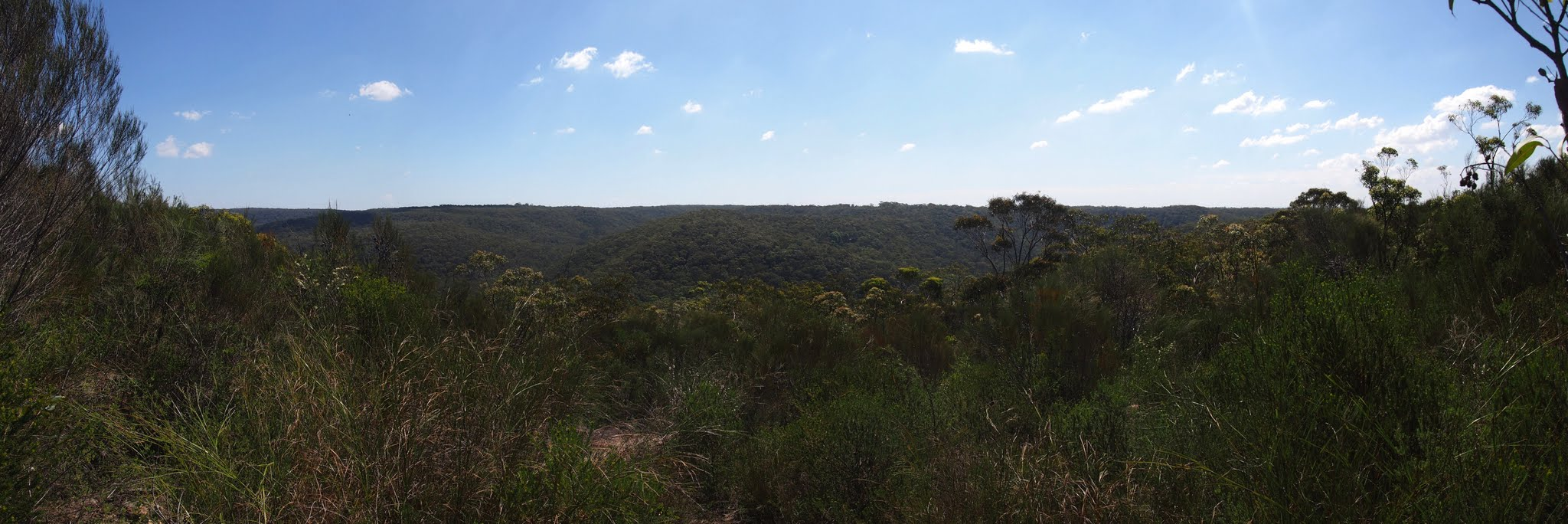
Winifred Falls Track (#5)

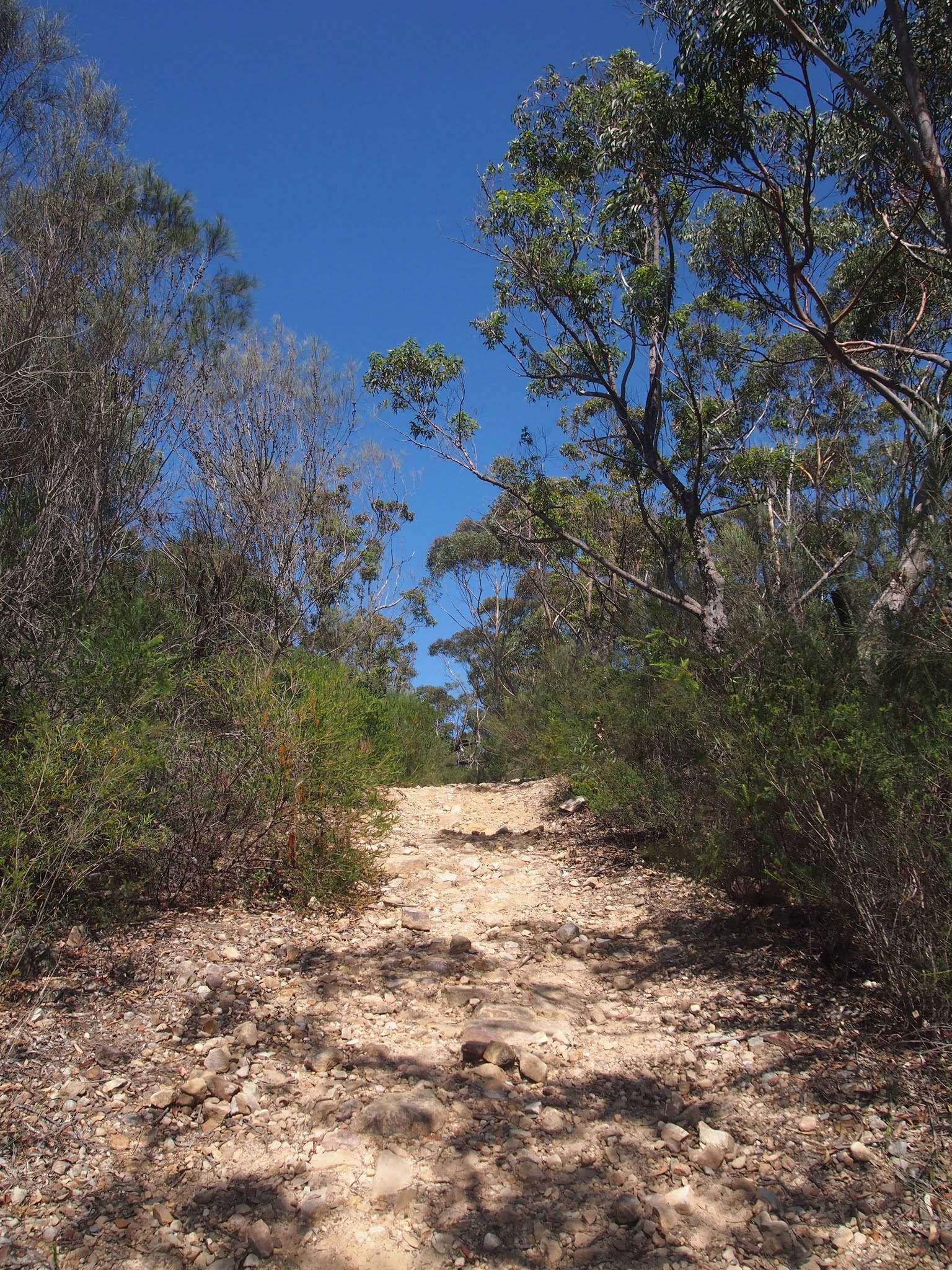
Winifred Falls Track (#6)

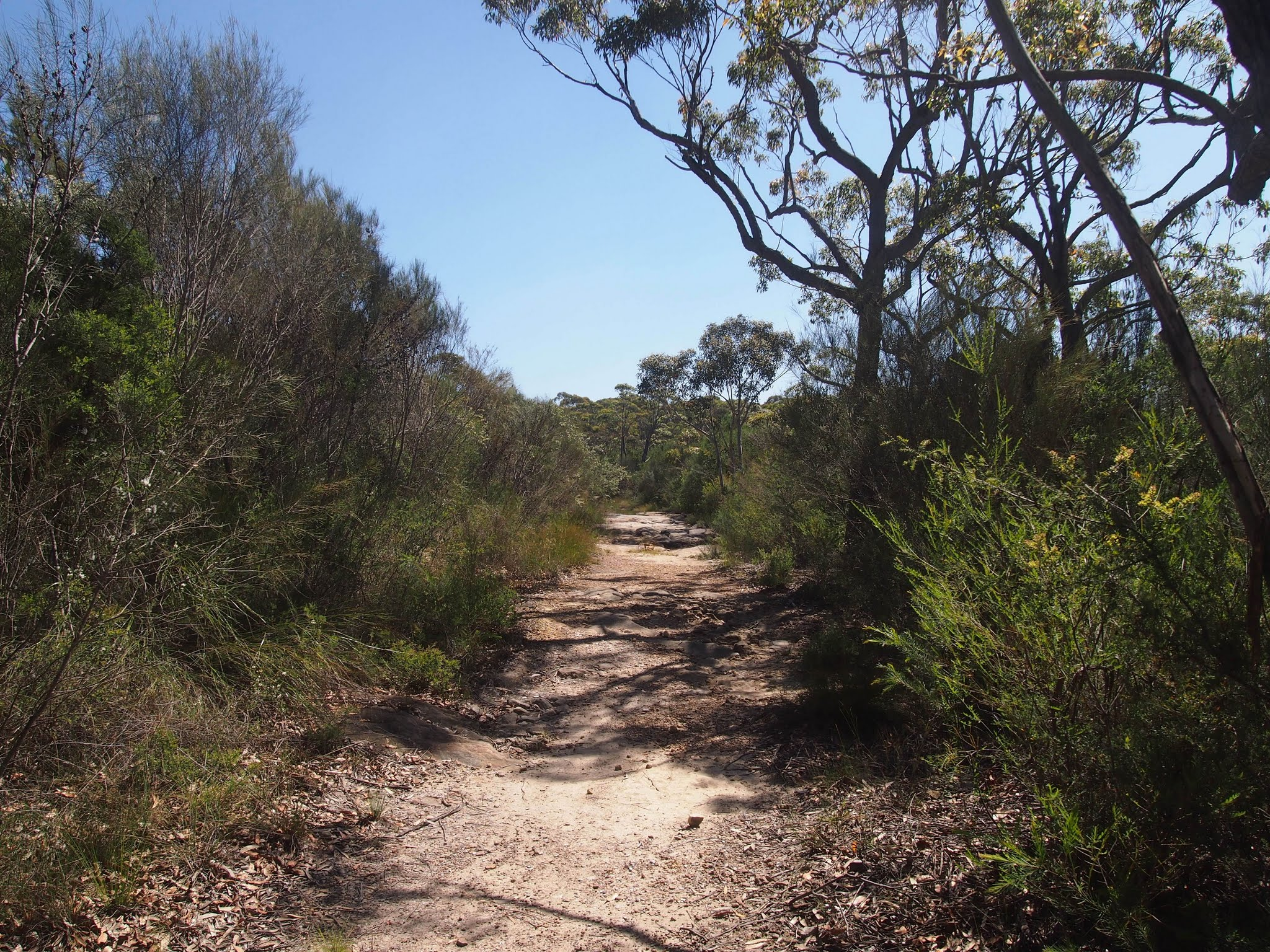
Winifred Falls Track (#7)

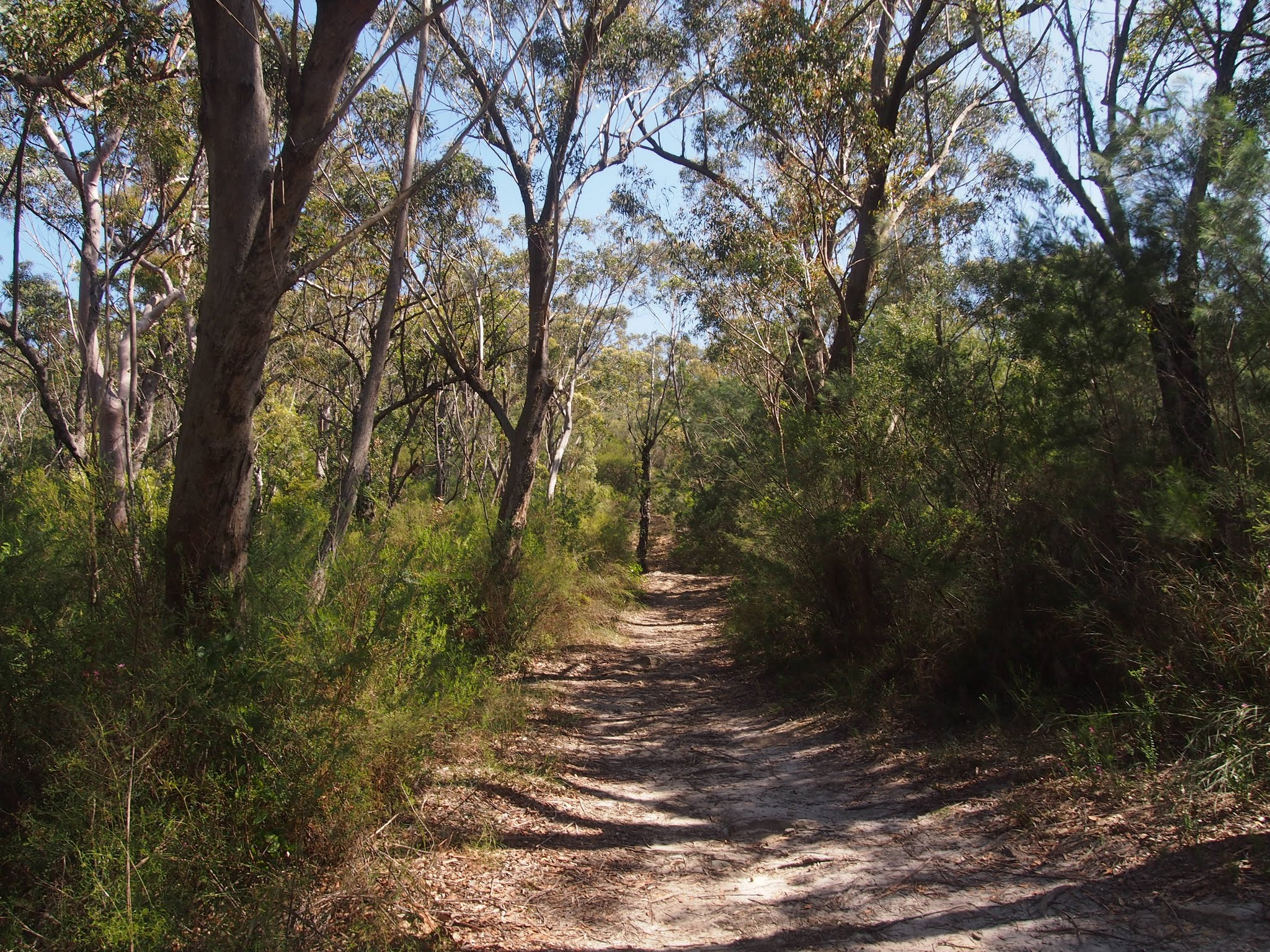
Winifred Falls Track (#8)

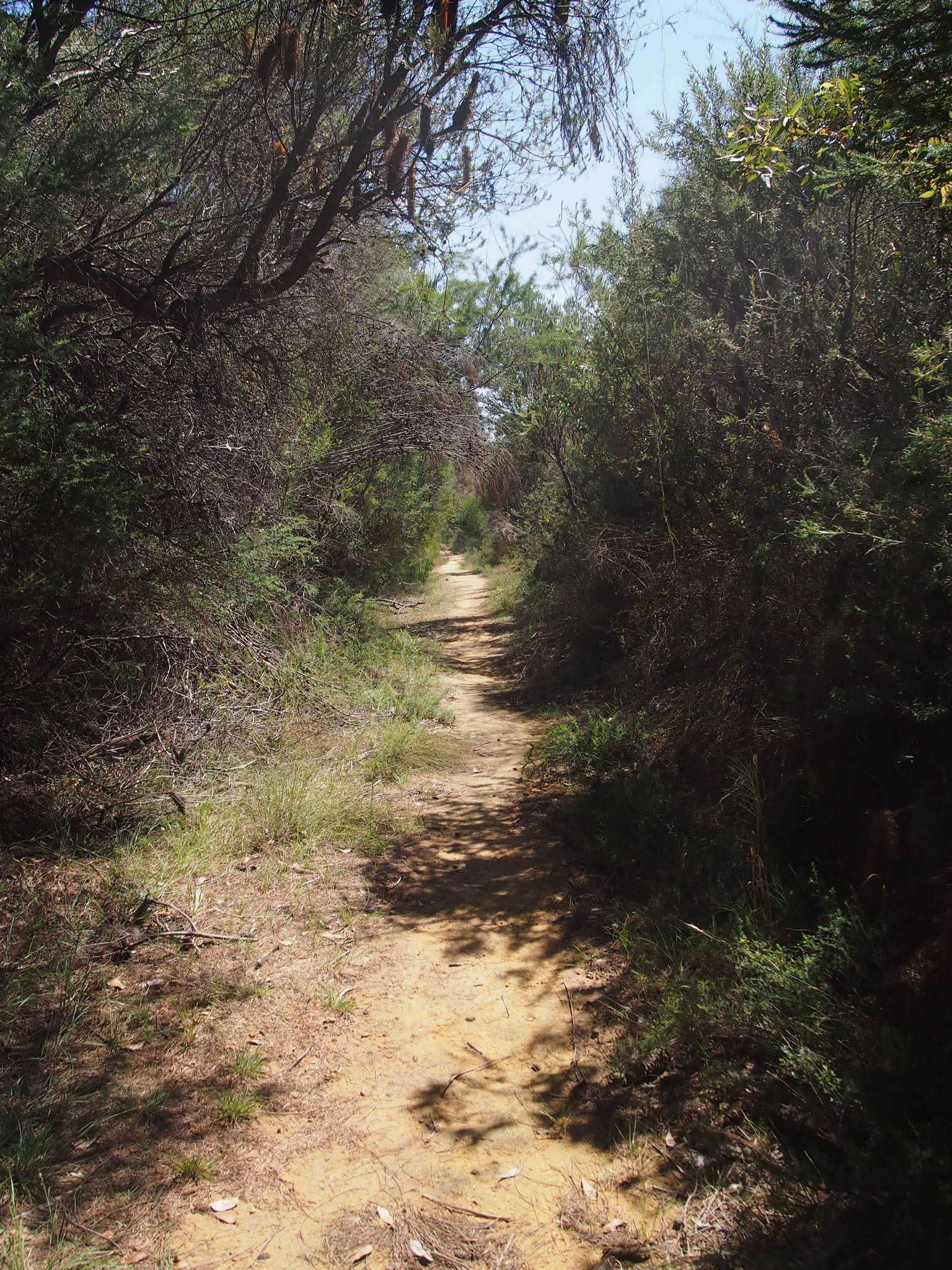
Winifred Falls Track (#9)

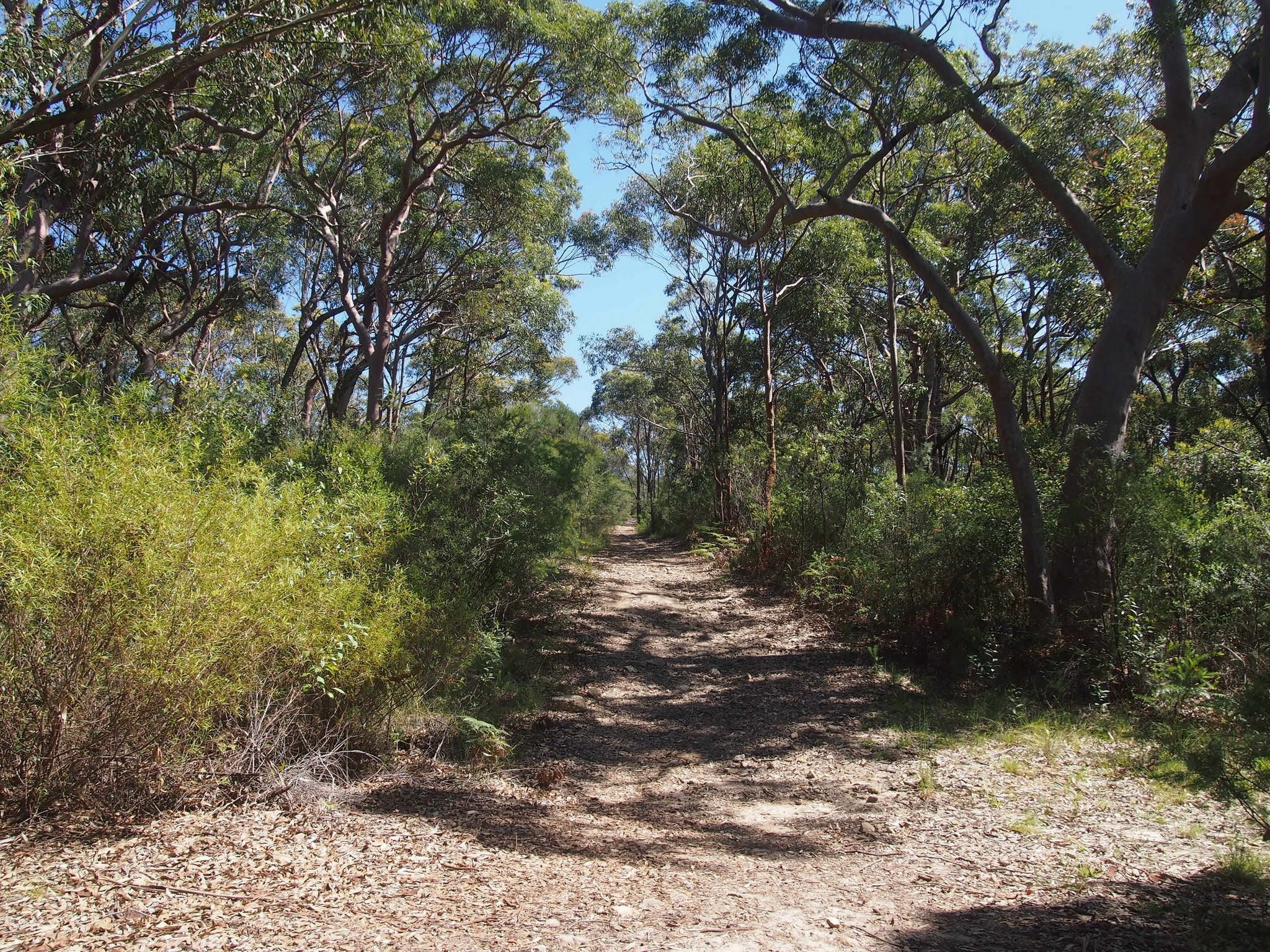
Winifred Falls Track (#10)

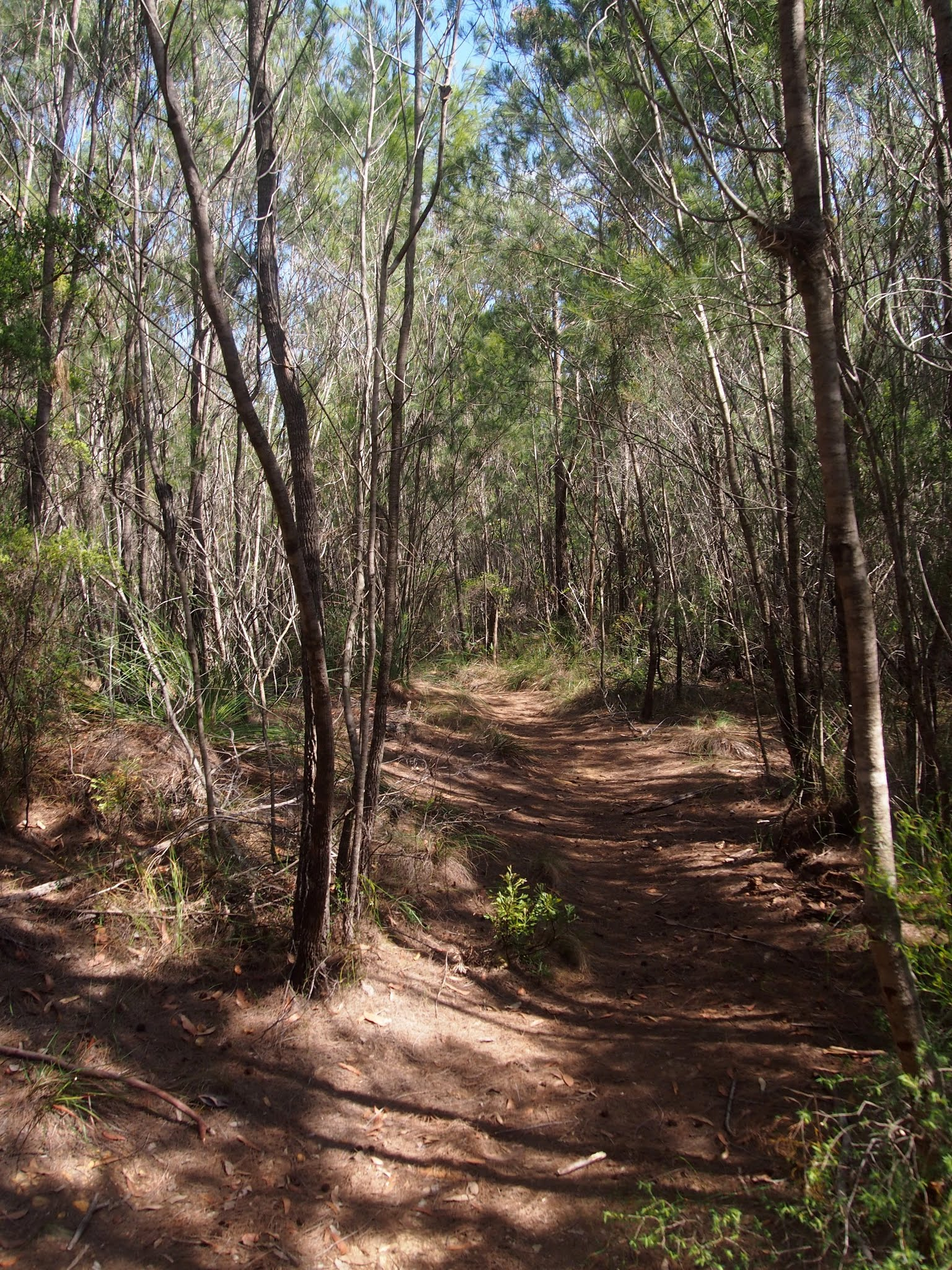
Winifred Falls Track (#11)

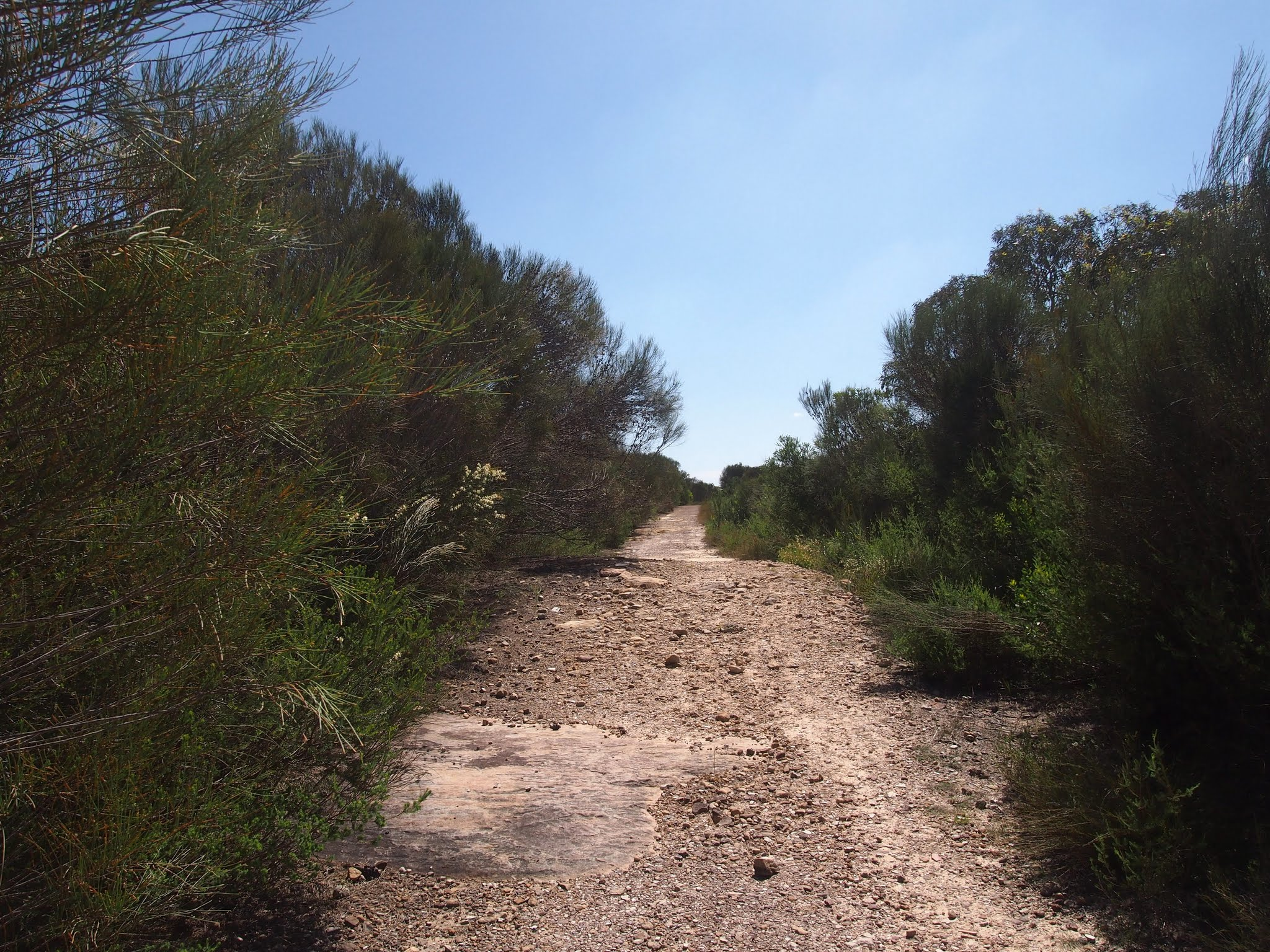
Winifred Falls Track (#12)

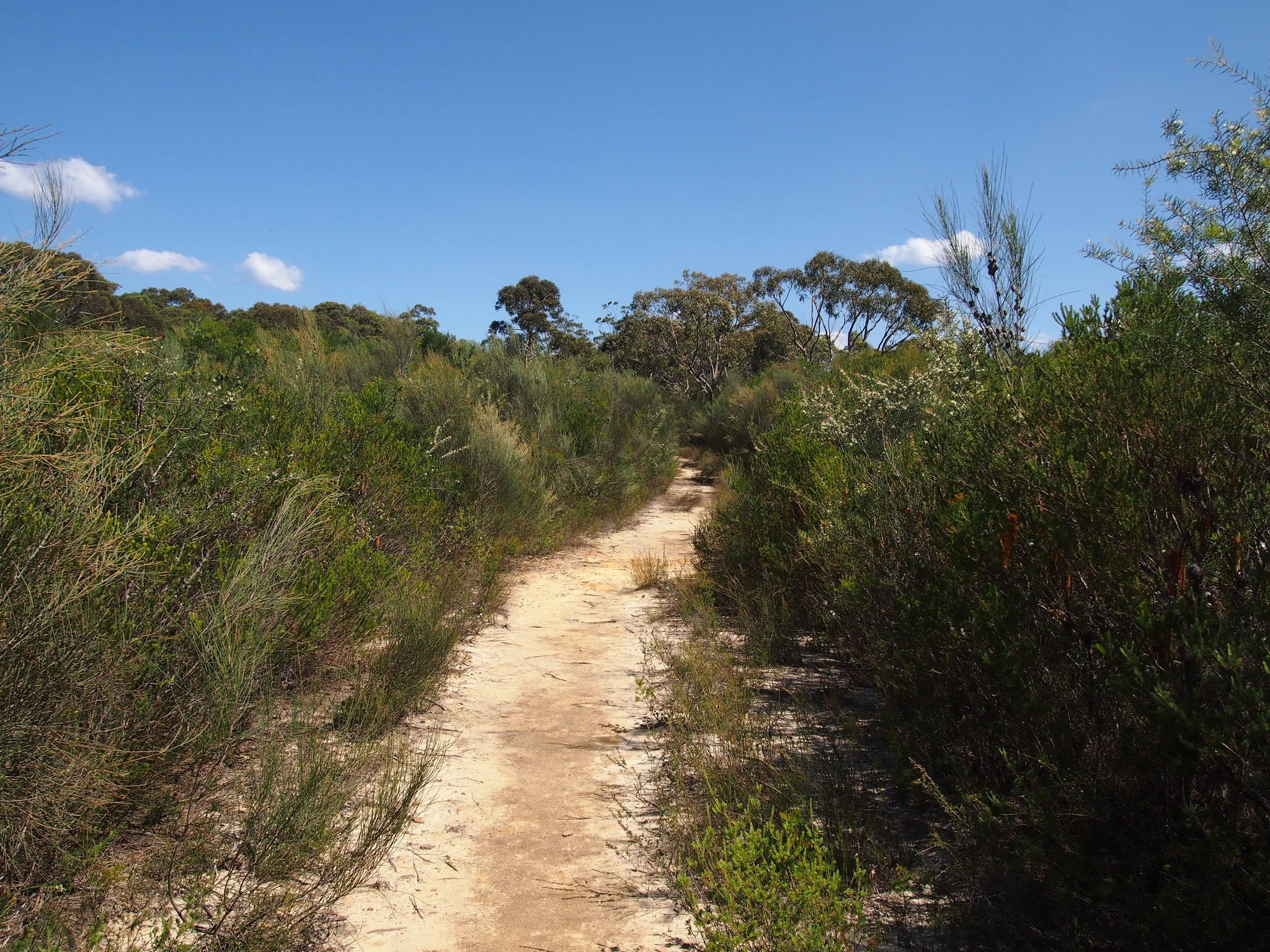
Winifred Falls Track (#13)

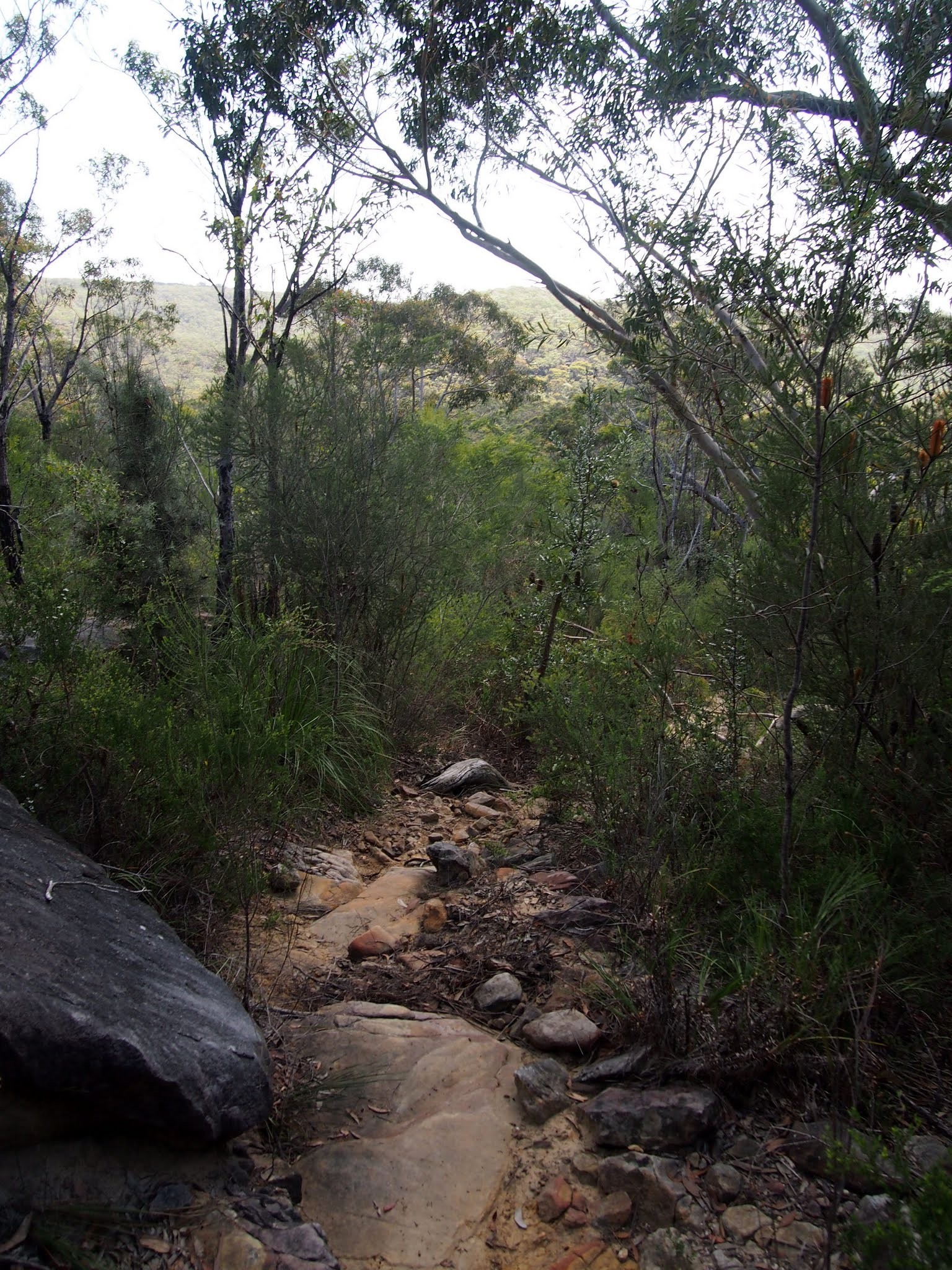
Winifred Falls Track (#14)

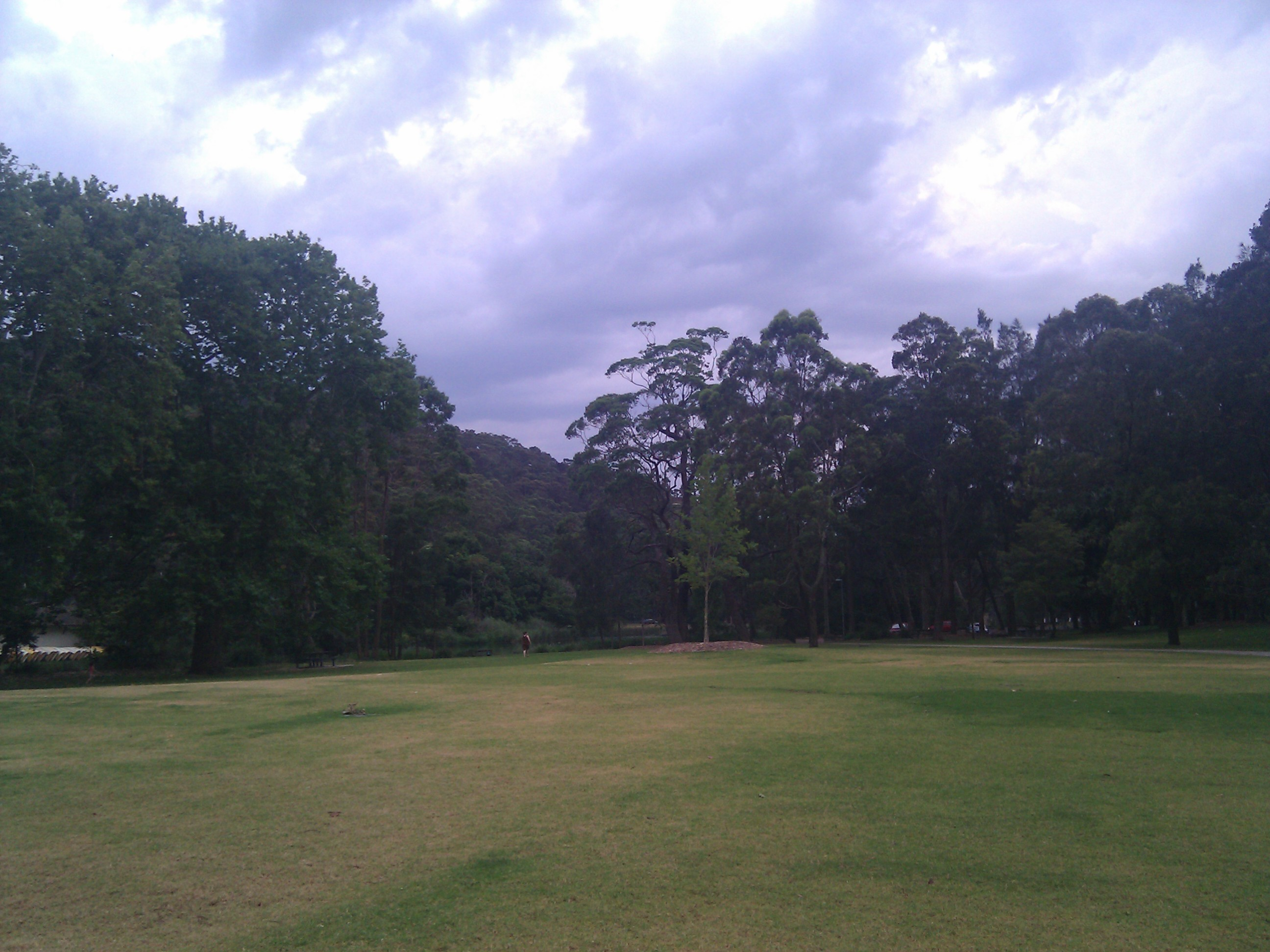
Audley NSW 2232, Australia – Panorama #1

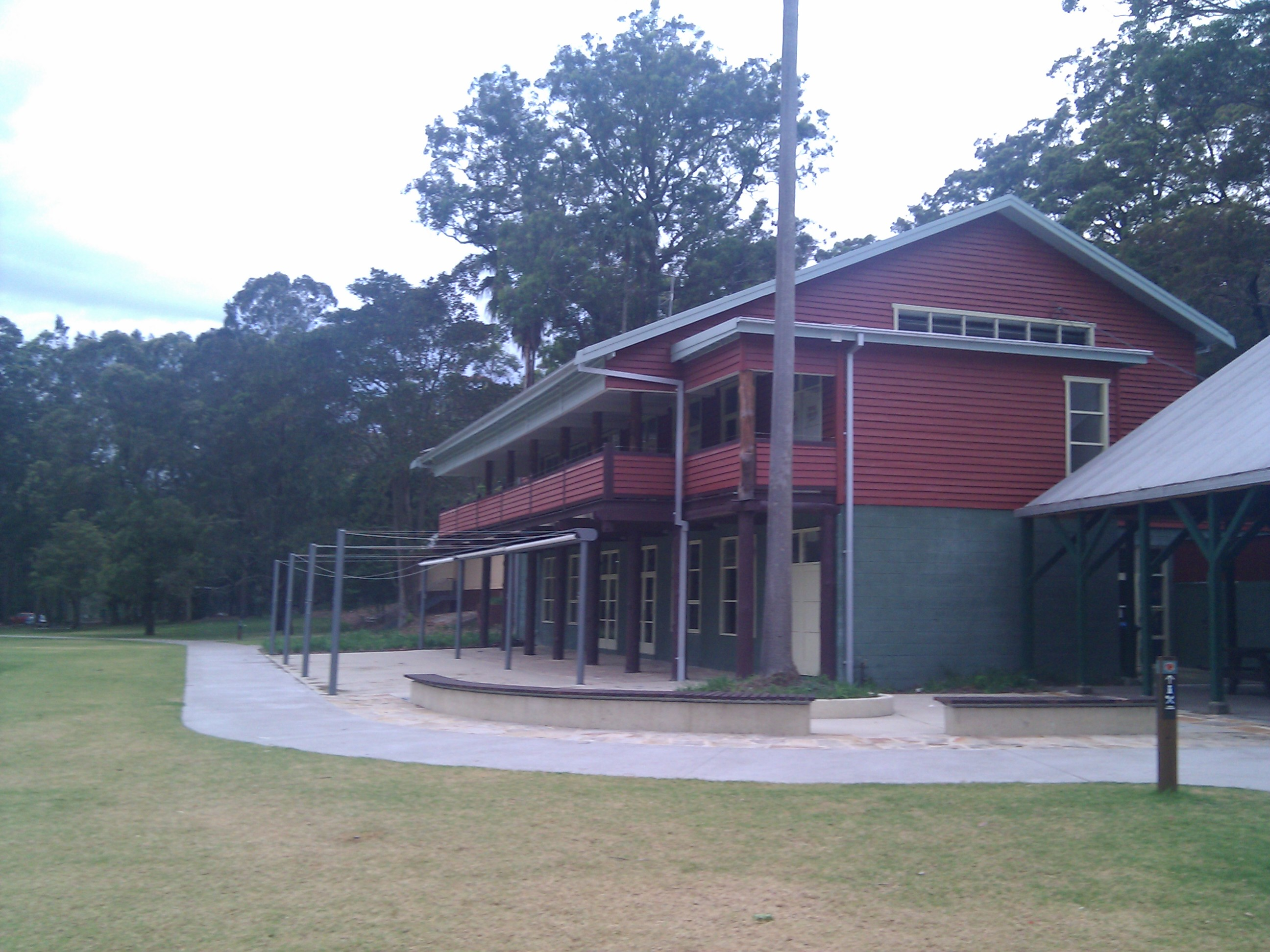
Audley NSW 2232, Australia – Panorama #2

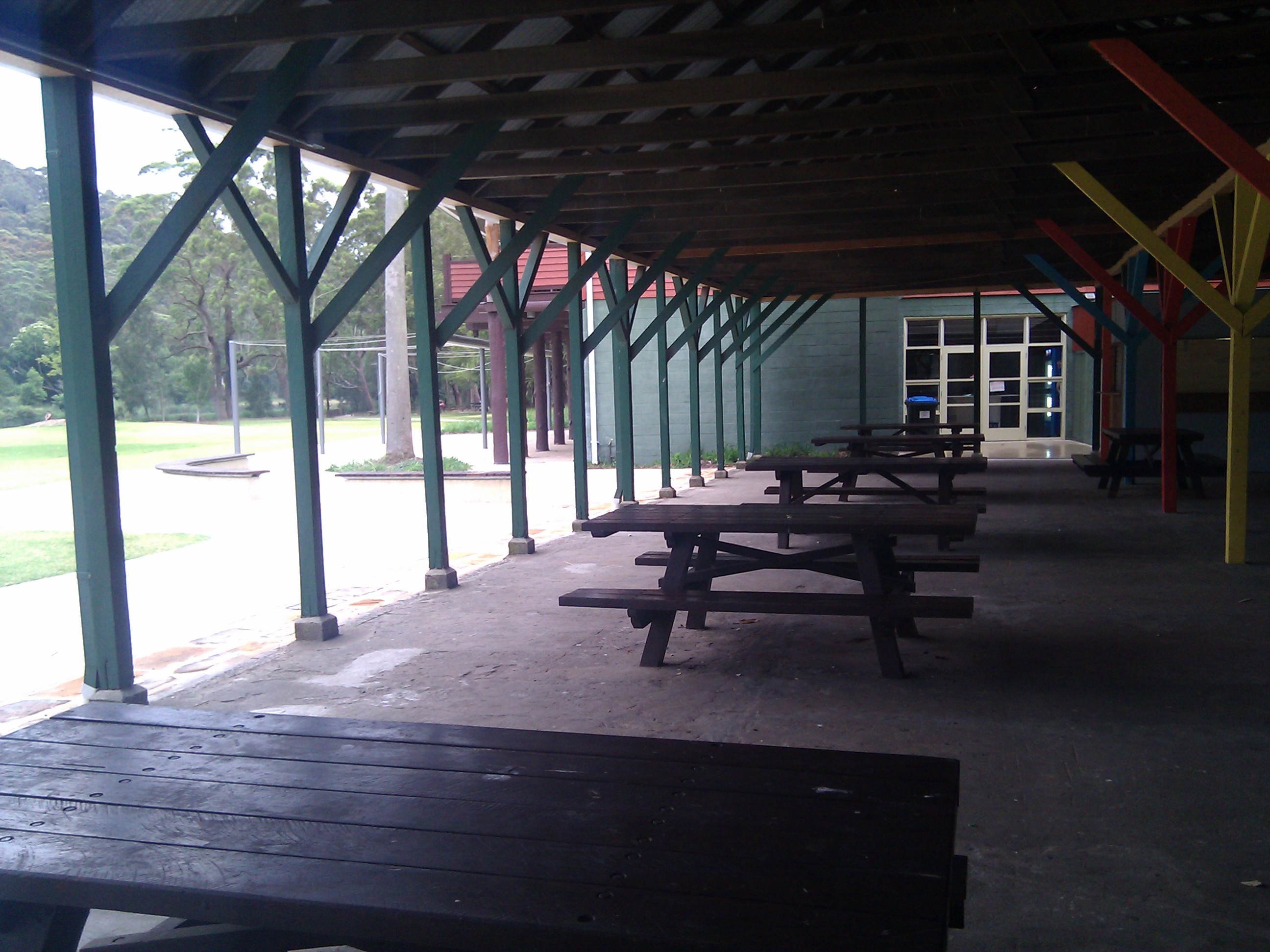
Audley NSW 2232, Australia – Panorama #3

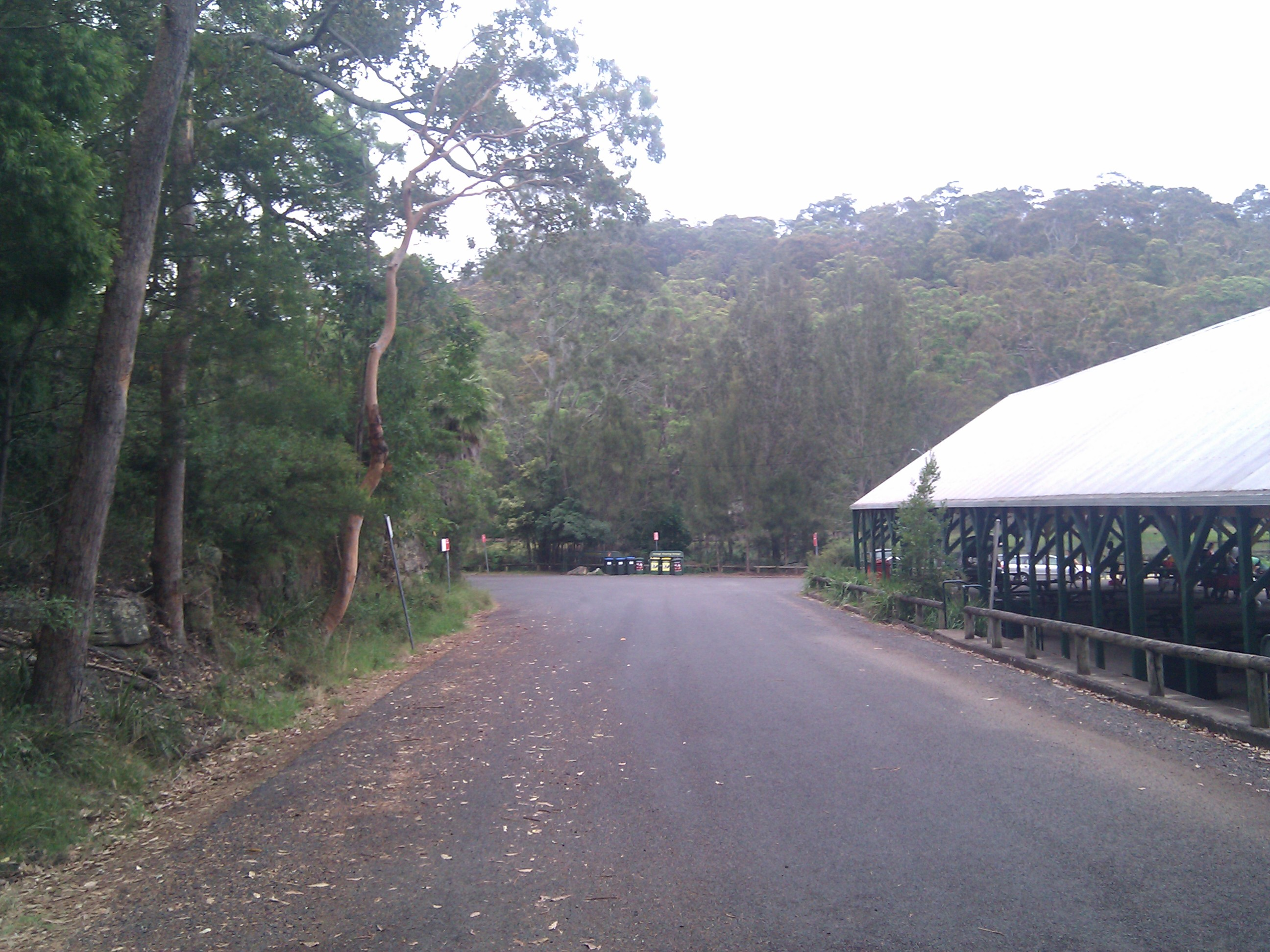
Audley NSW 2232, Australia – Panorama #4

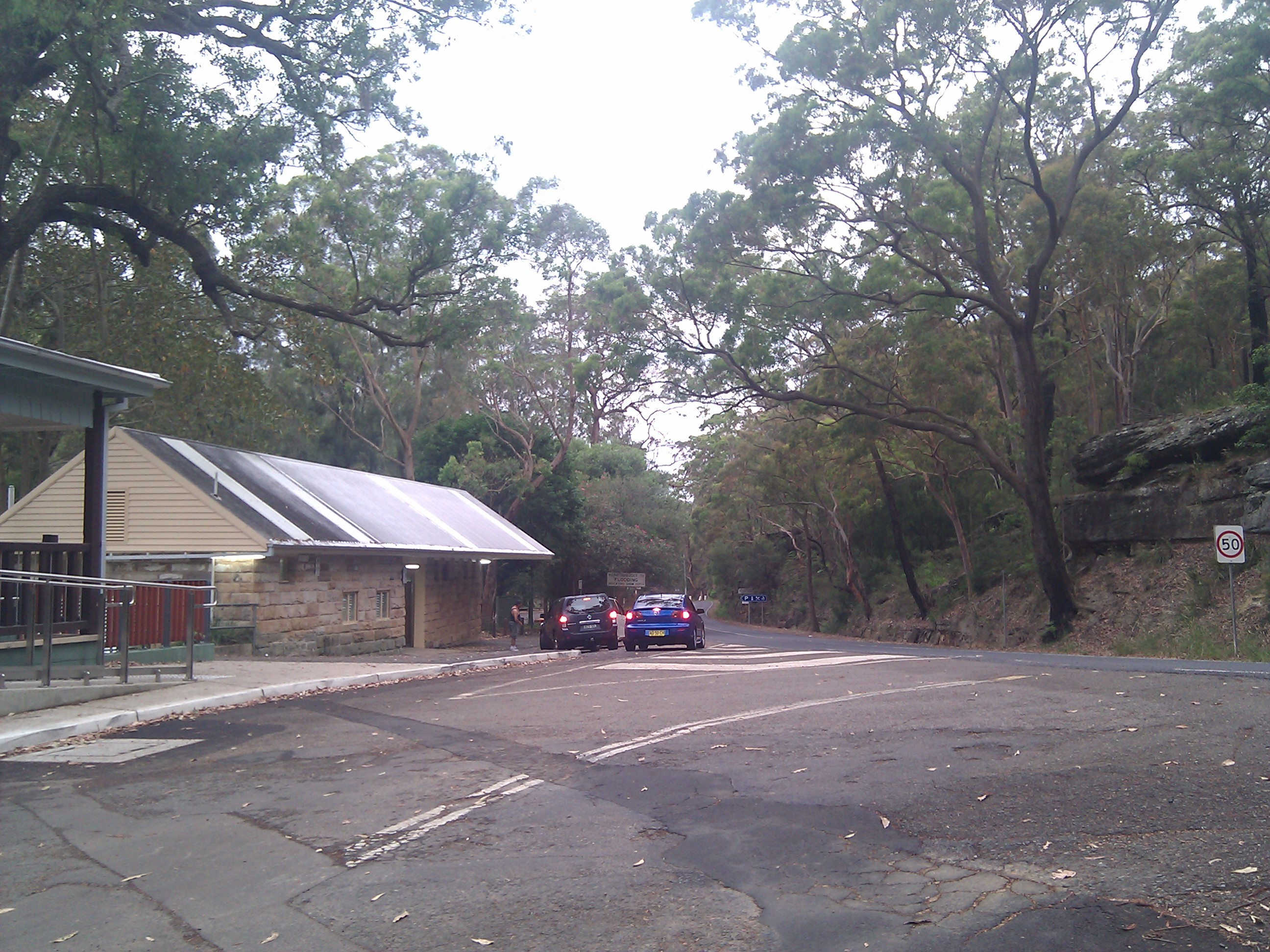
Audley NSW 2232, Australia – Panorama #5

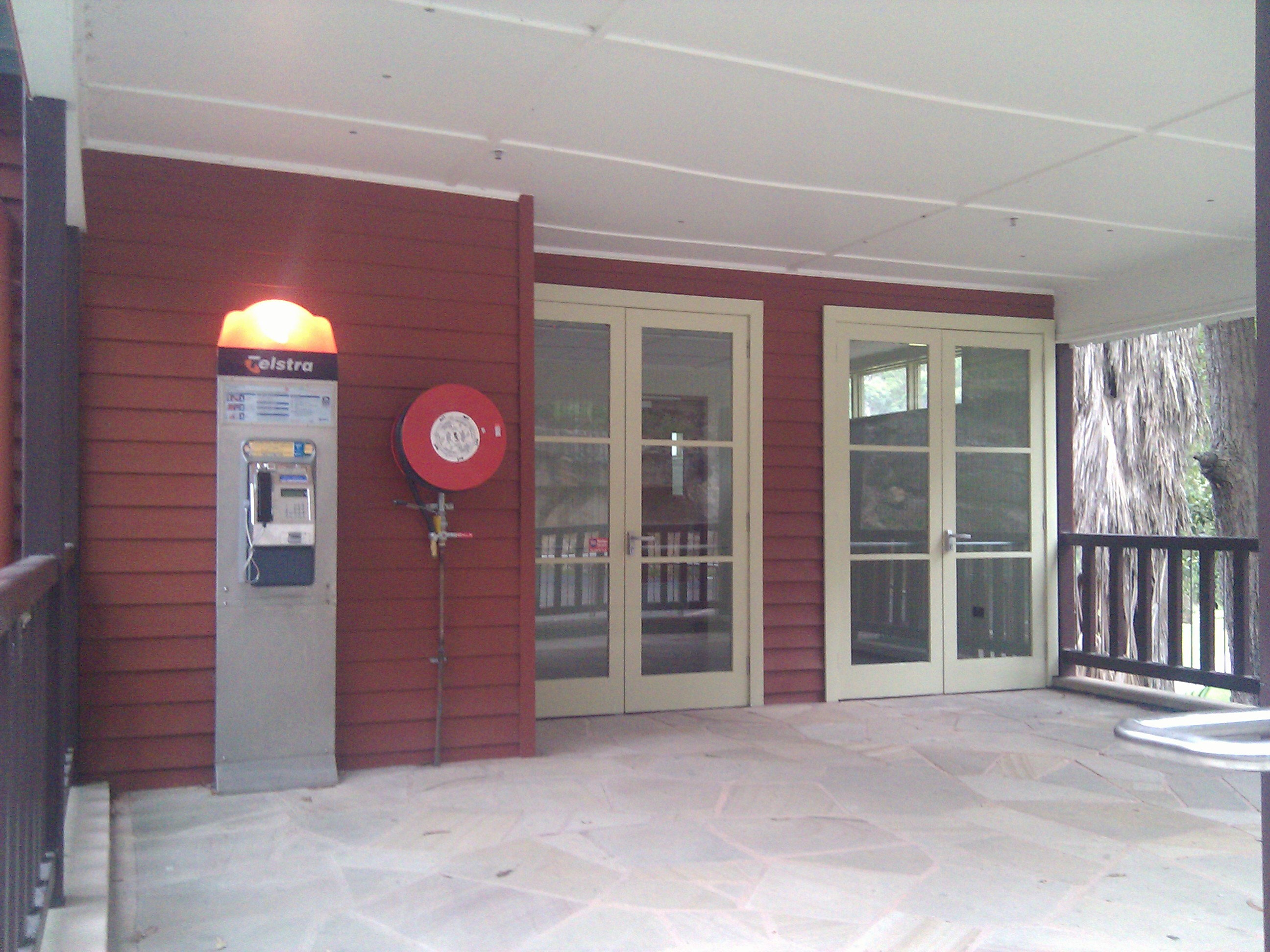
Audley NSW 2232, Australia – Panorama #6

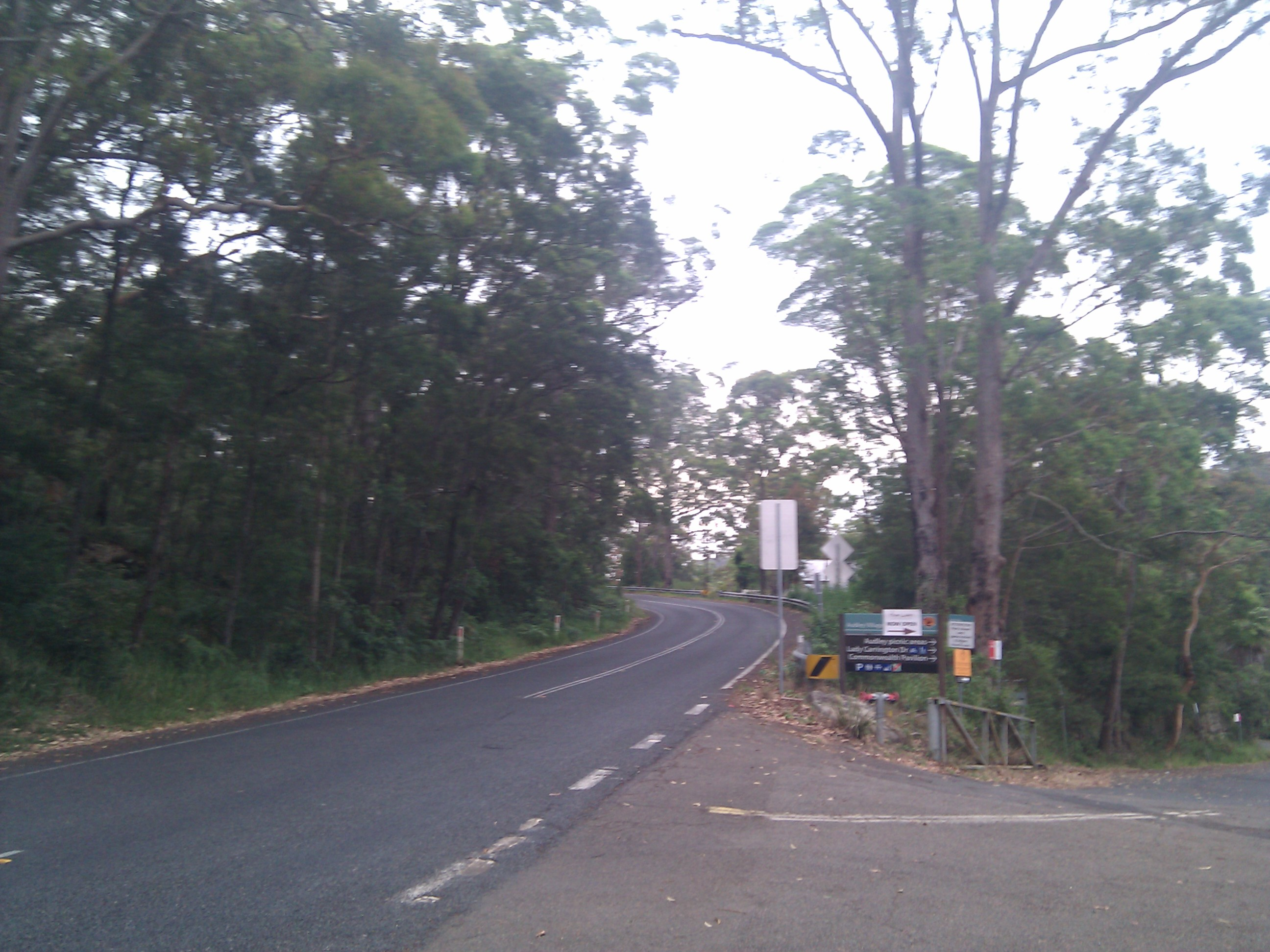
Audley NSW 2232, Australia – Panorama #7

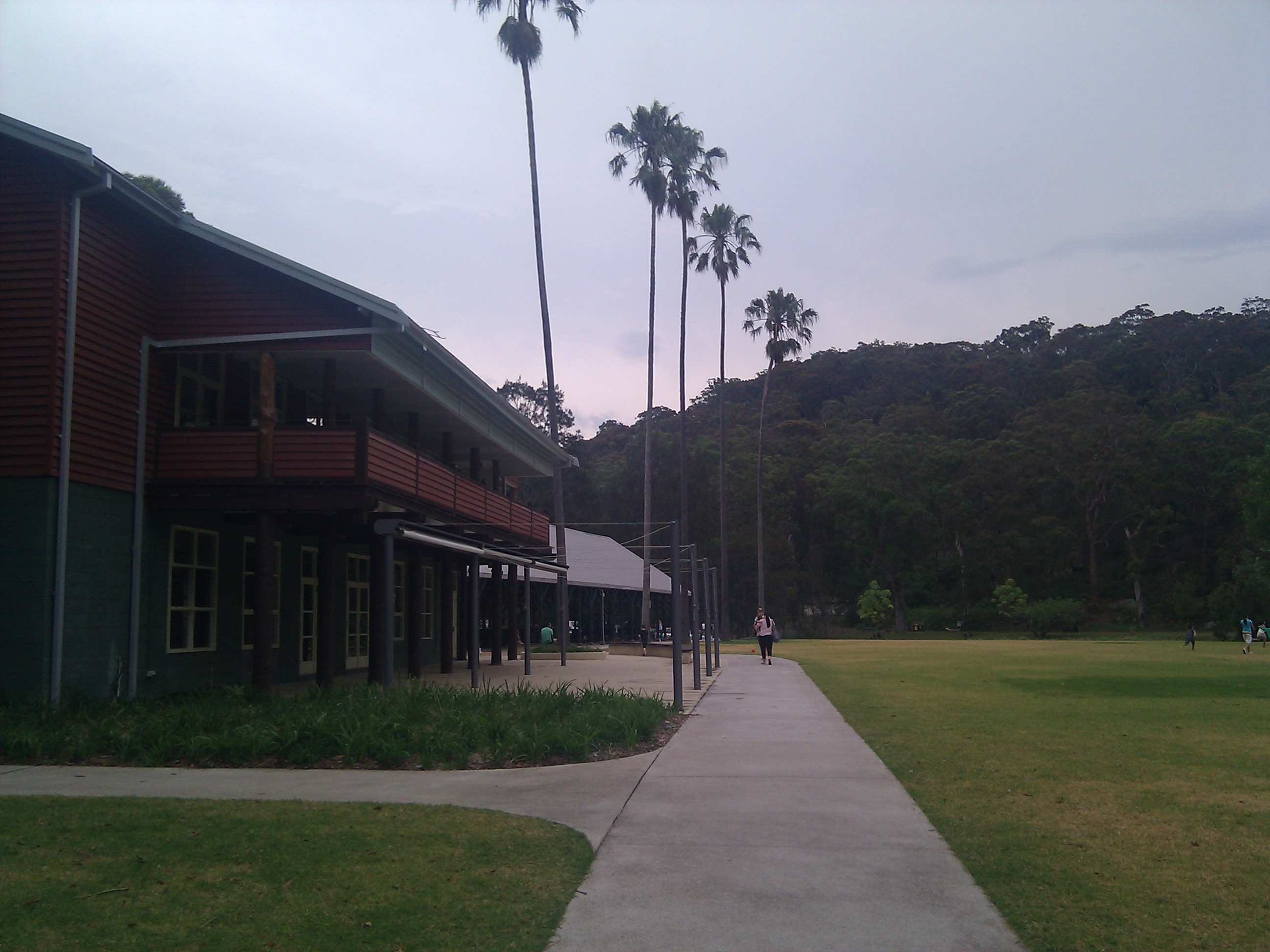
Audley NSW 2232, Australia – Panorama #8

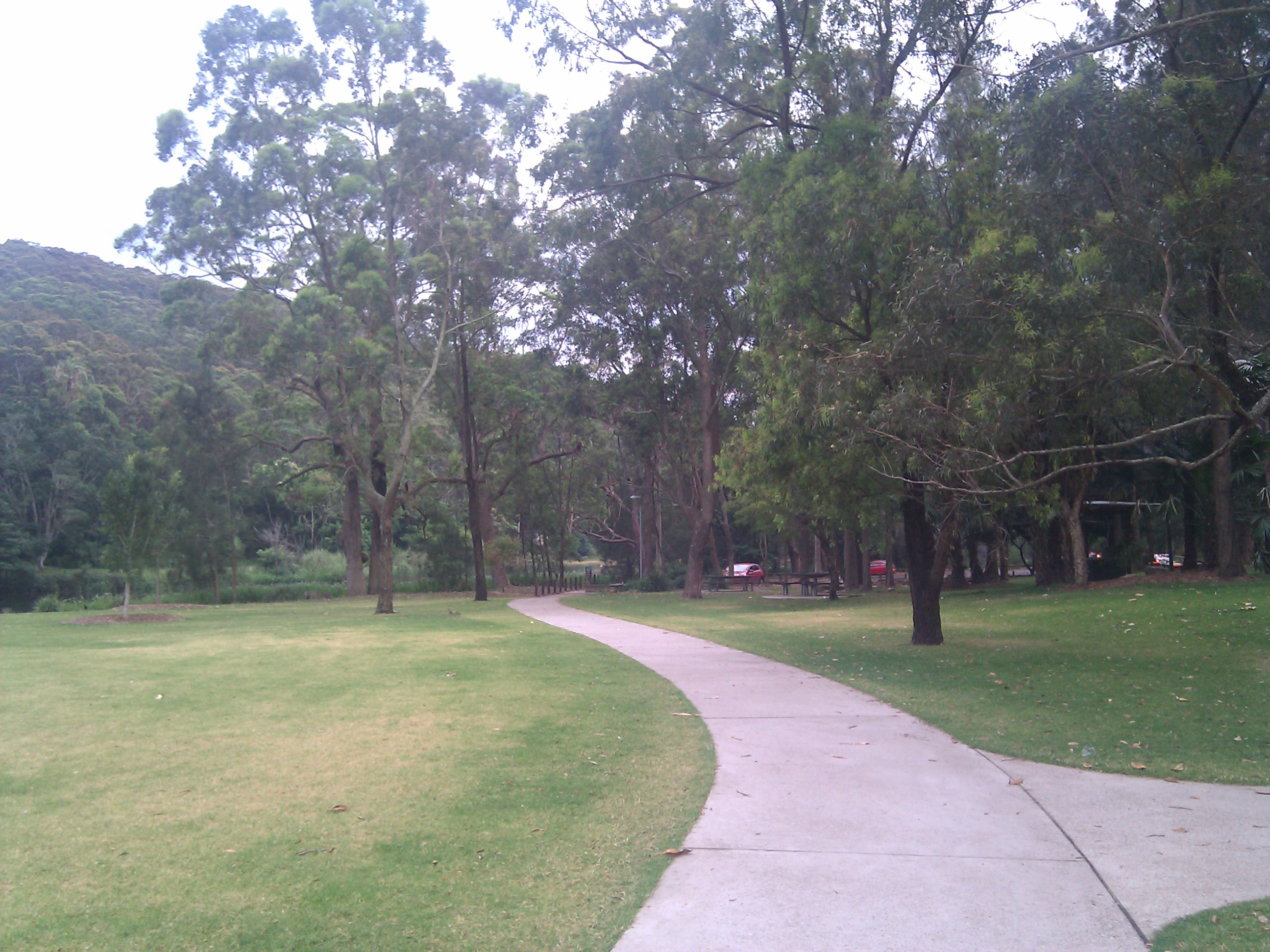
Audley NSW 2232, Australia – Panorama #9

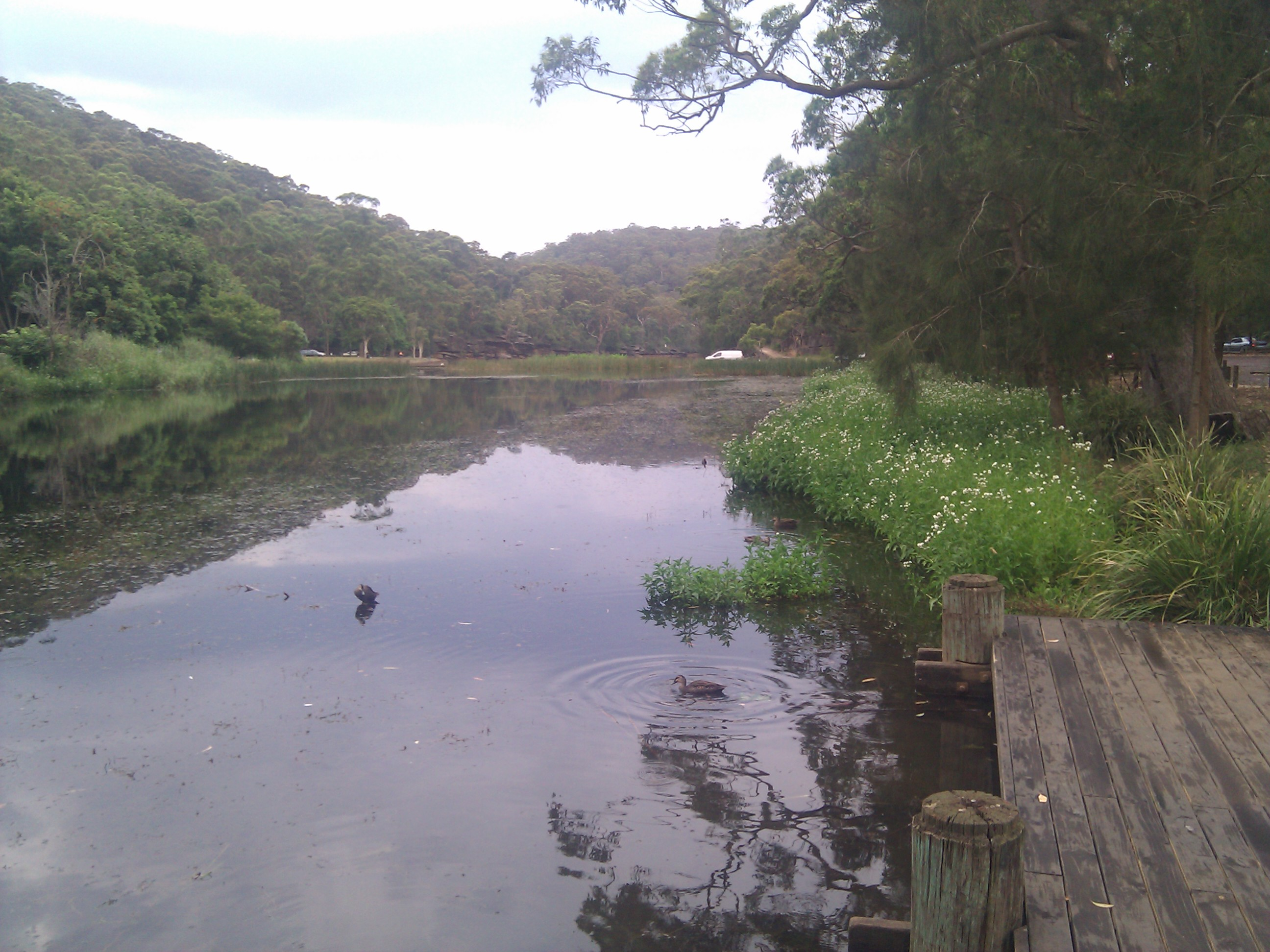
Audley NSW 2232, Australia – Panorama #10

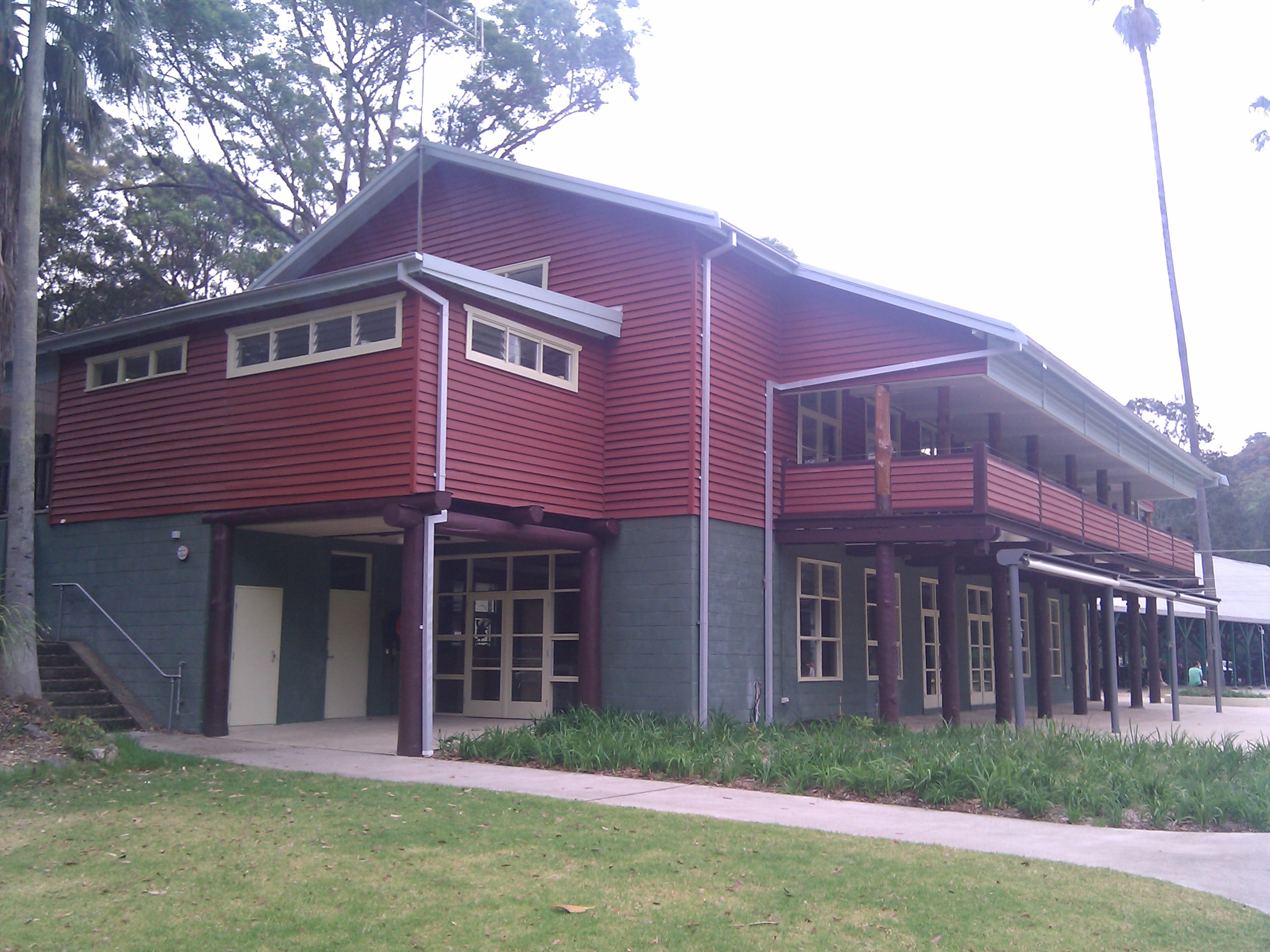
Audley NSW 2232, Australia – Panorama #11

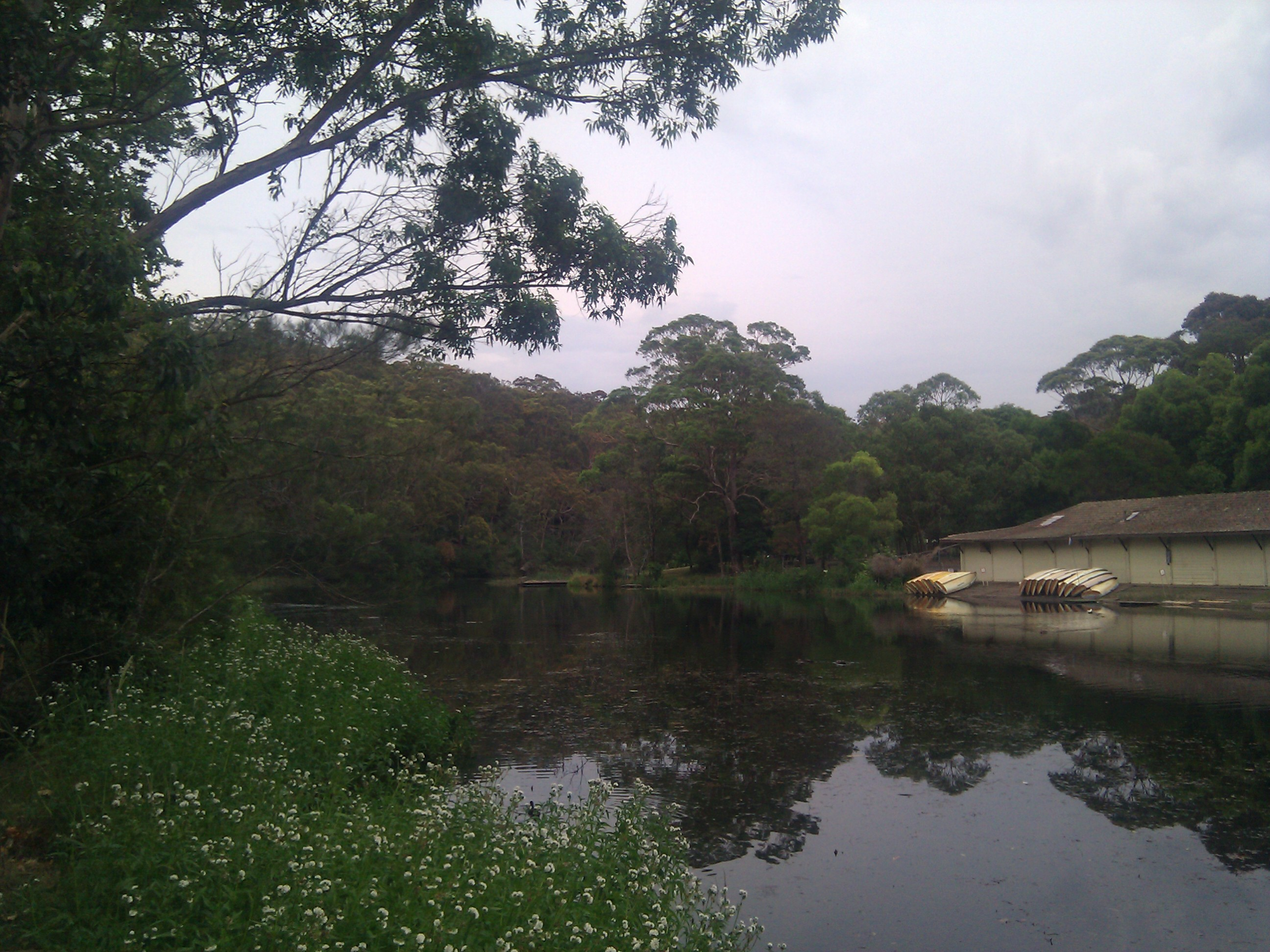
Audley NSW 2232, Australia – Panorama #12

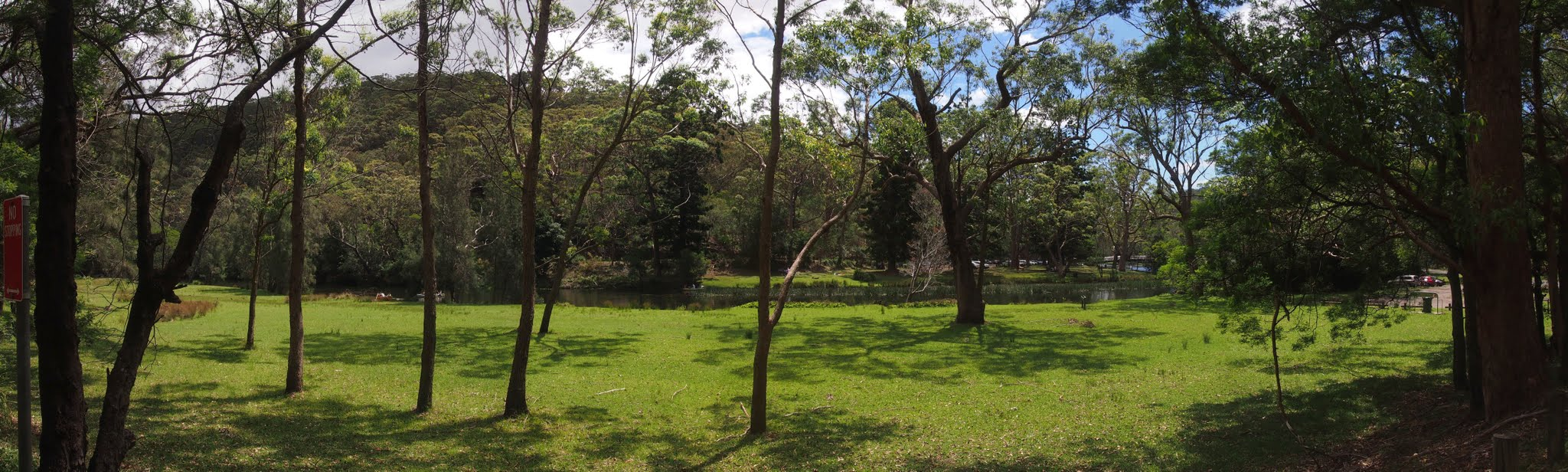
Audley NSW 2232, Australia – Panorama #13

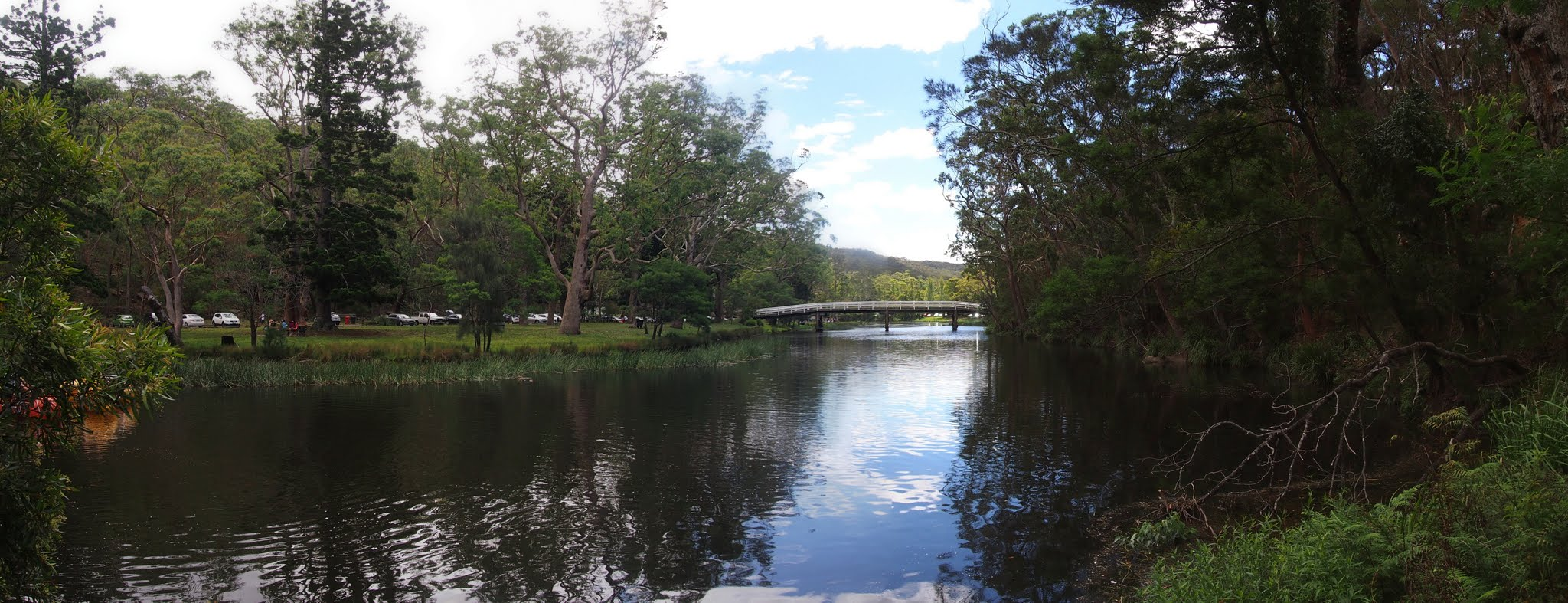
Audley NSW 2232, Australia – Panorama #14

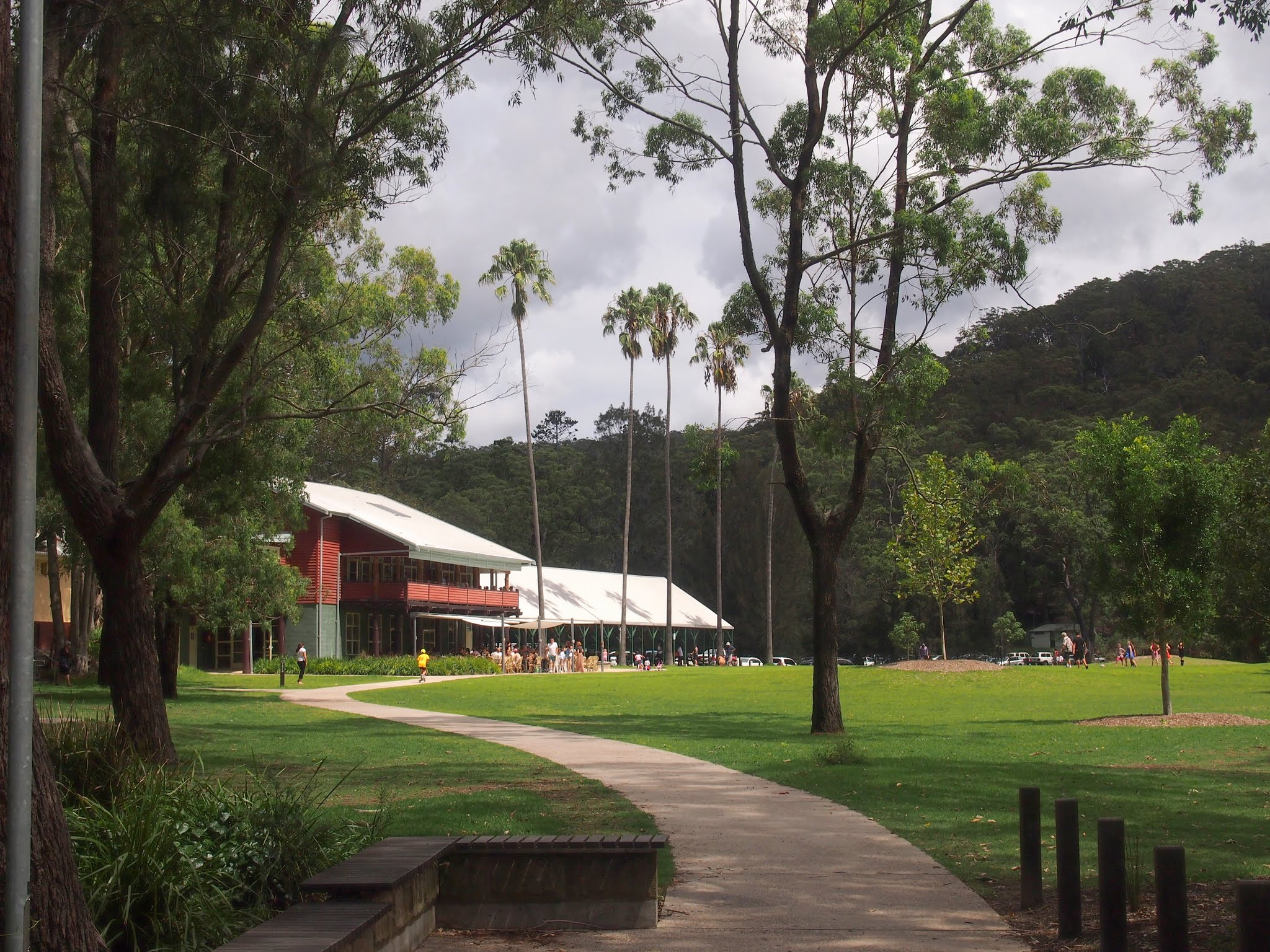
Audley NSW 2232, Australia – Panorama #15

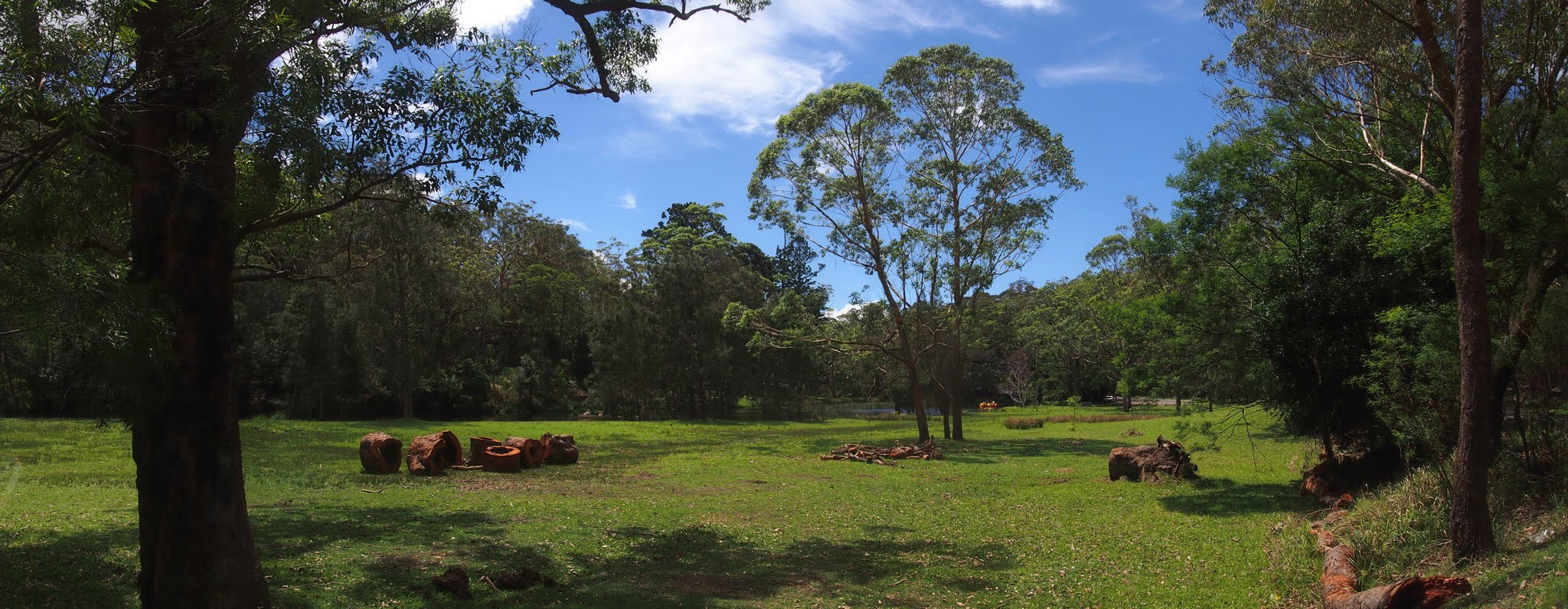
Audley NSW 2232, Australia – Panorama #16

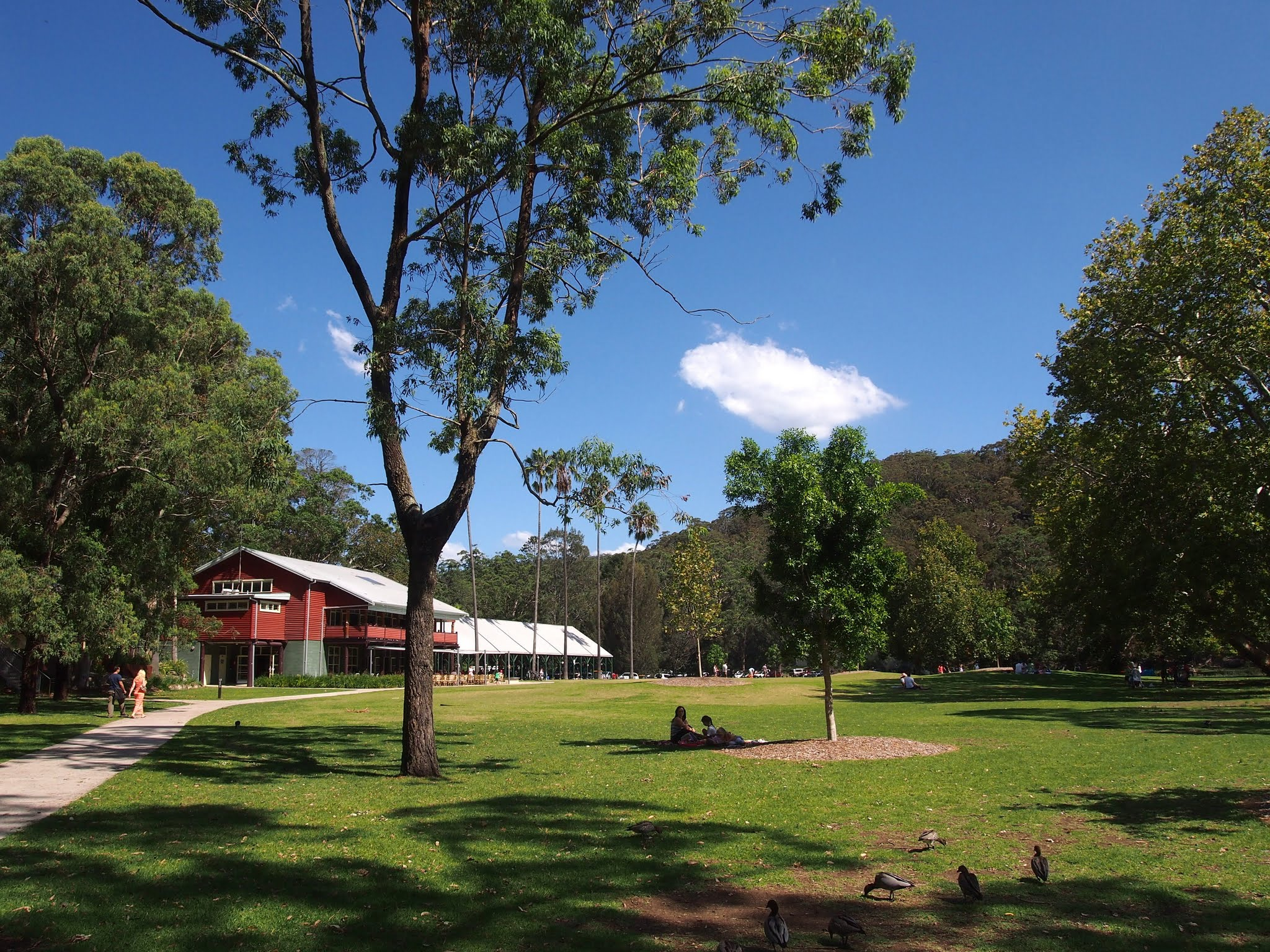
Audley NSW 2232, Australia – Panorama #17

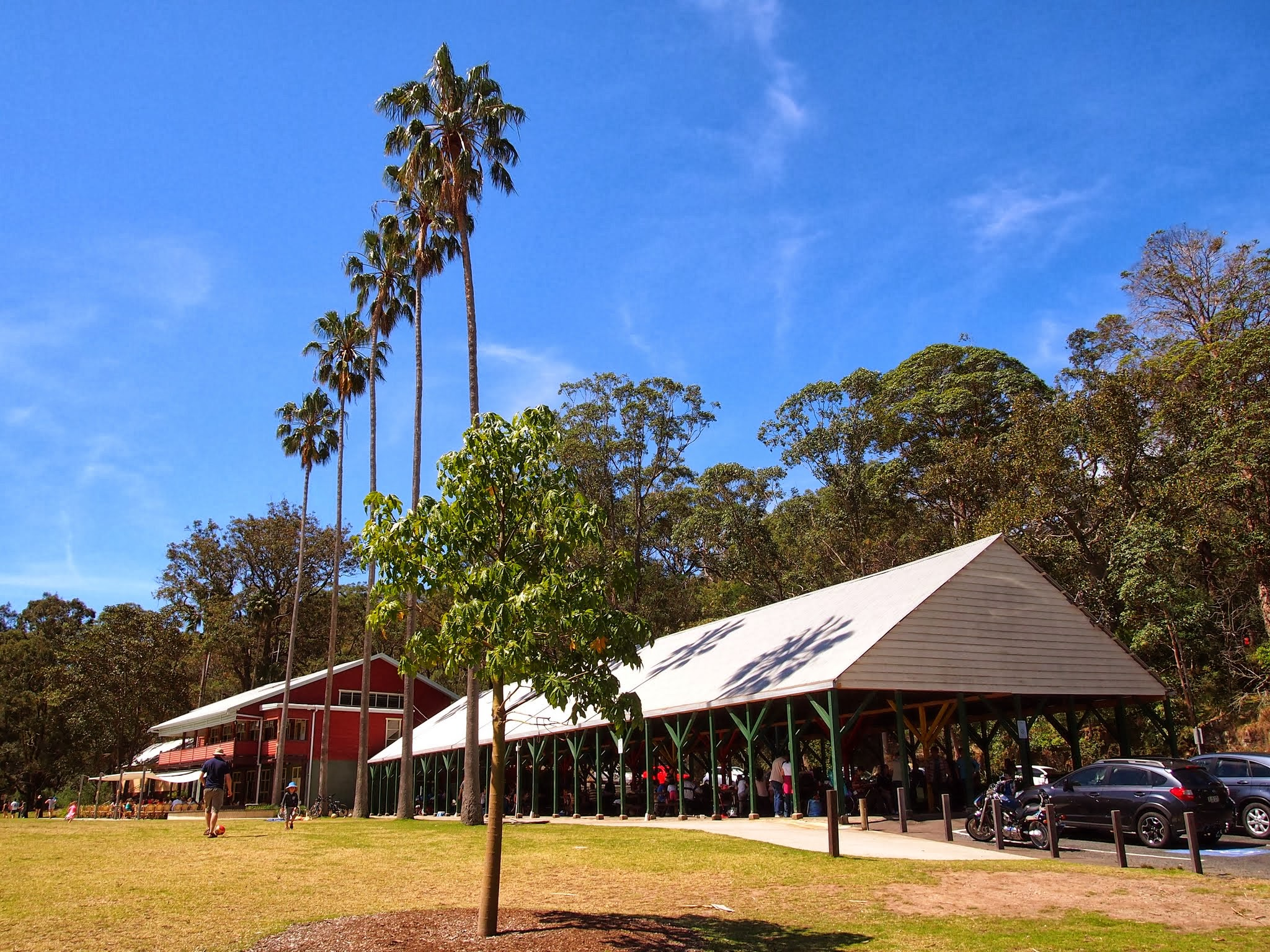
Audley NSW 2232, Australia – Panorama #18

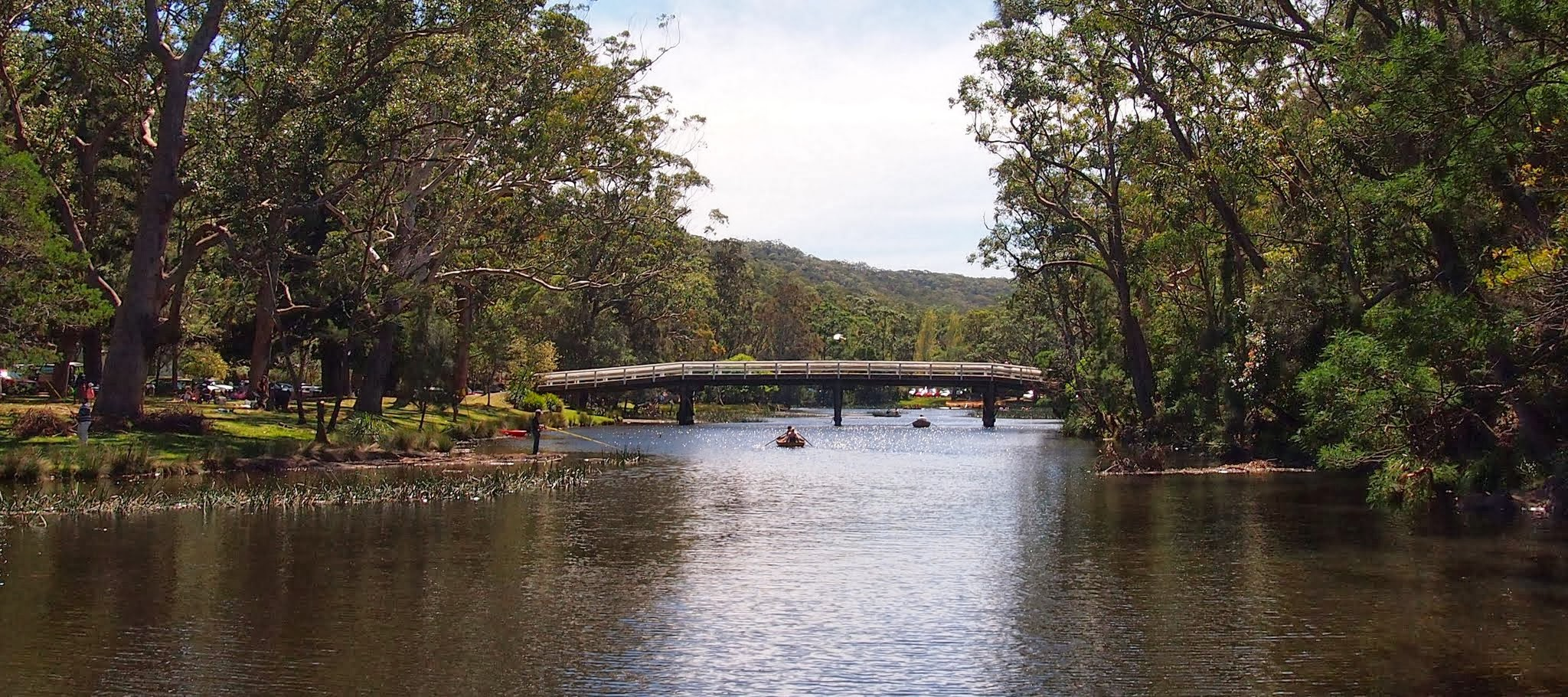
Audley NSW 2232, Australia – Panorama #19

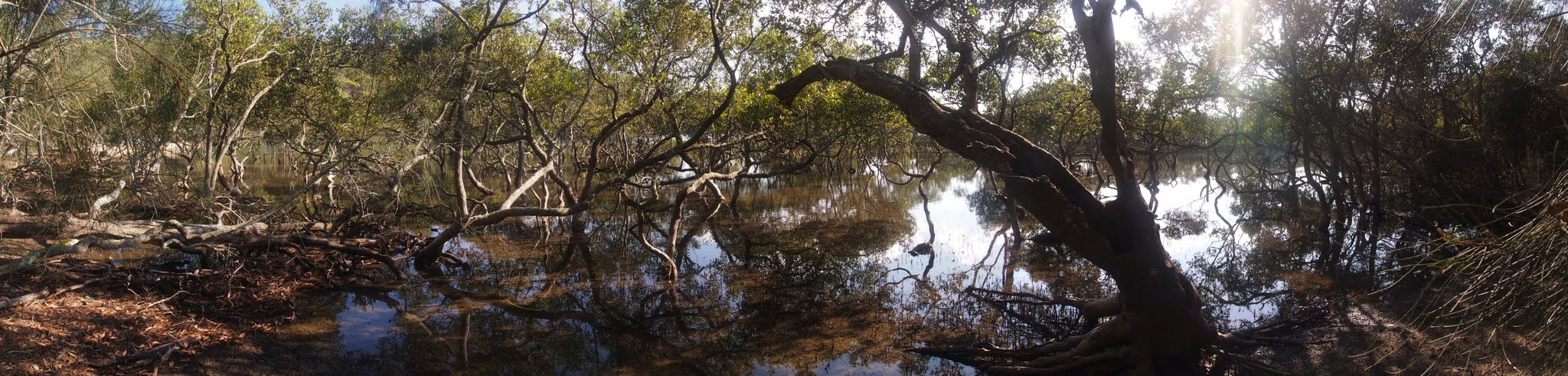
Bonnie Vale (#1)

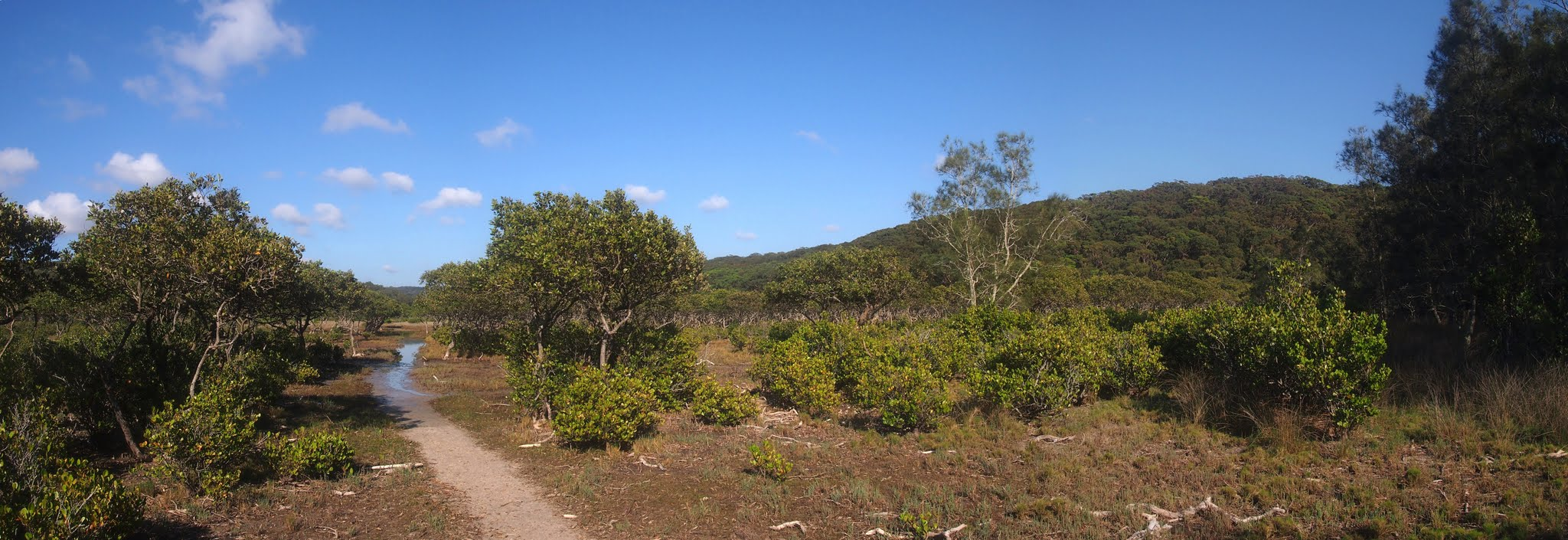
Bonnie Vale (#2)

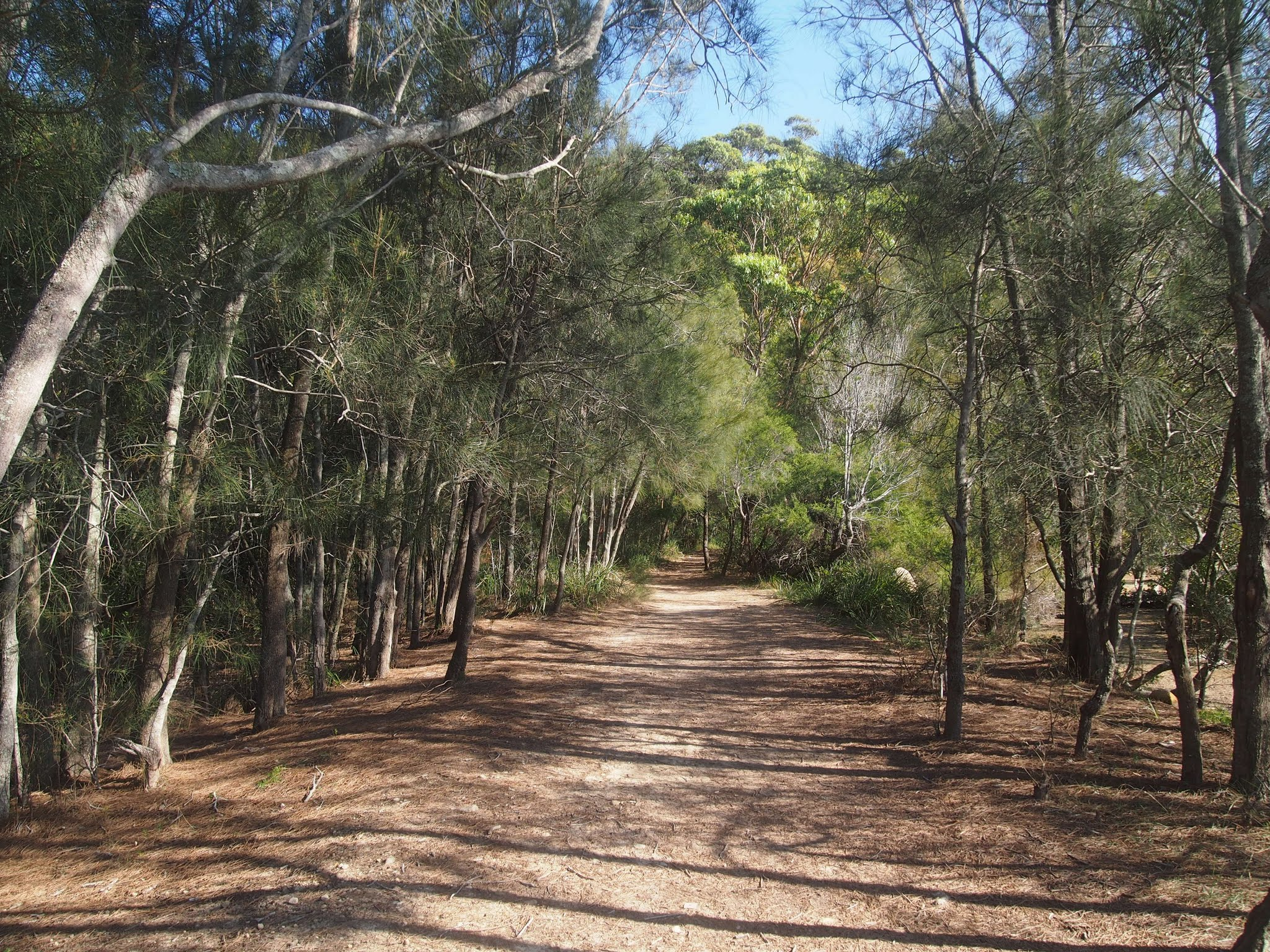
Bonnie Vale (#3)

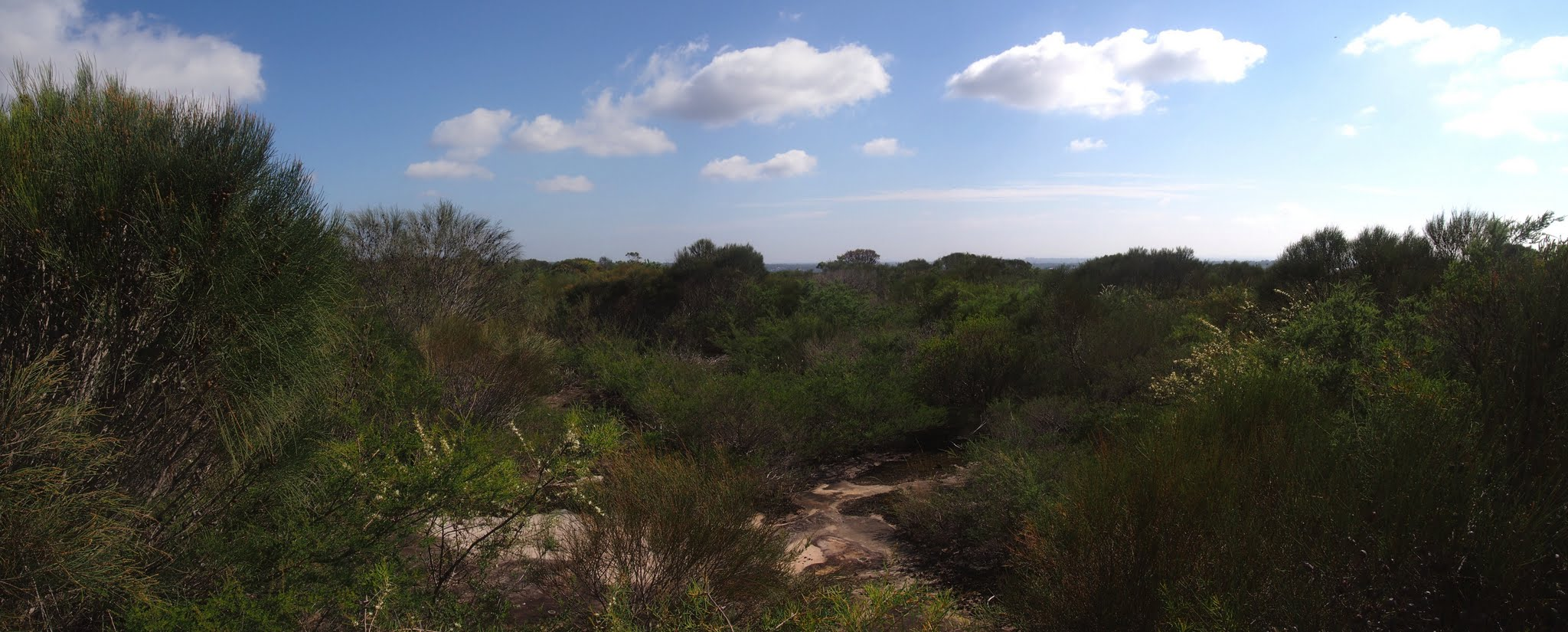
Maianbar Road

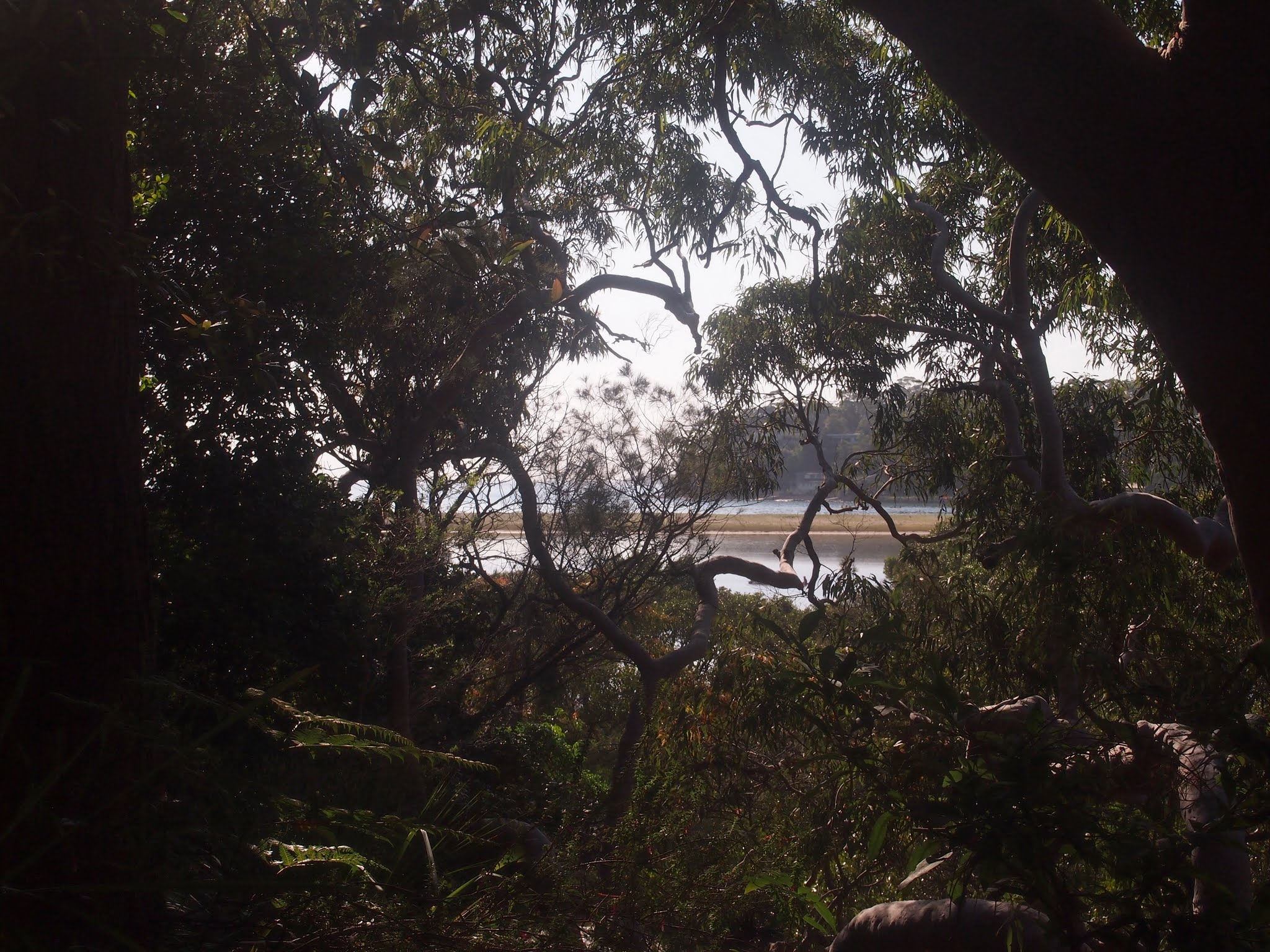
Maianbar NSW 2230, Australia – Panorama #1

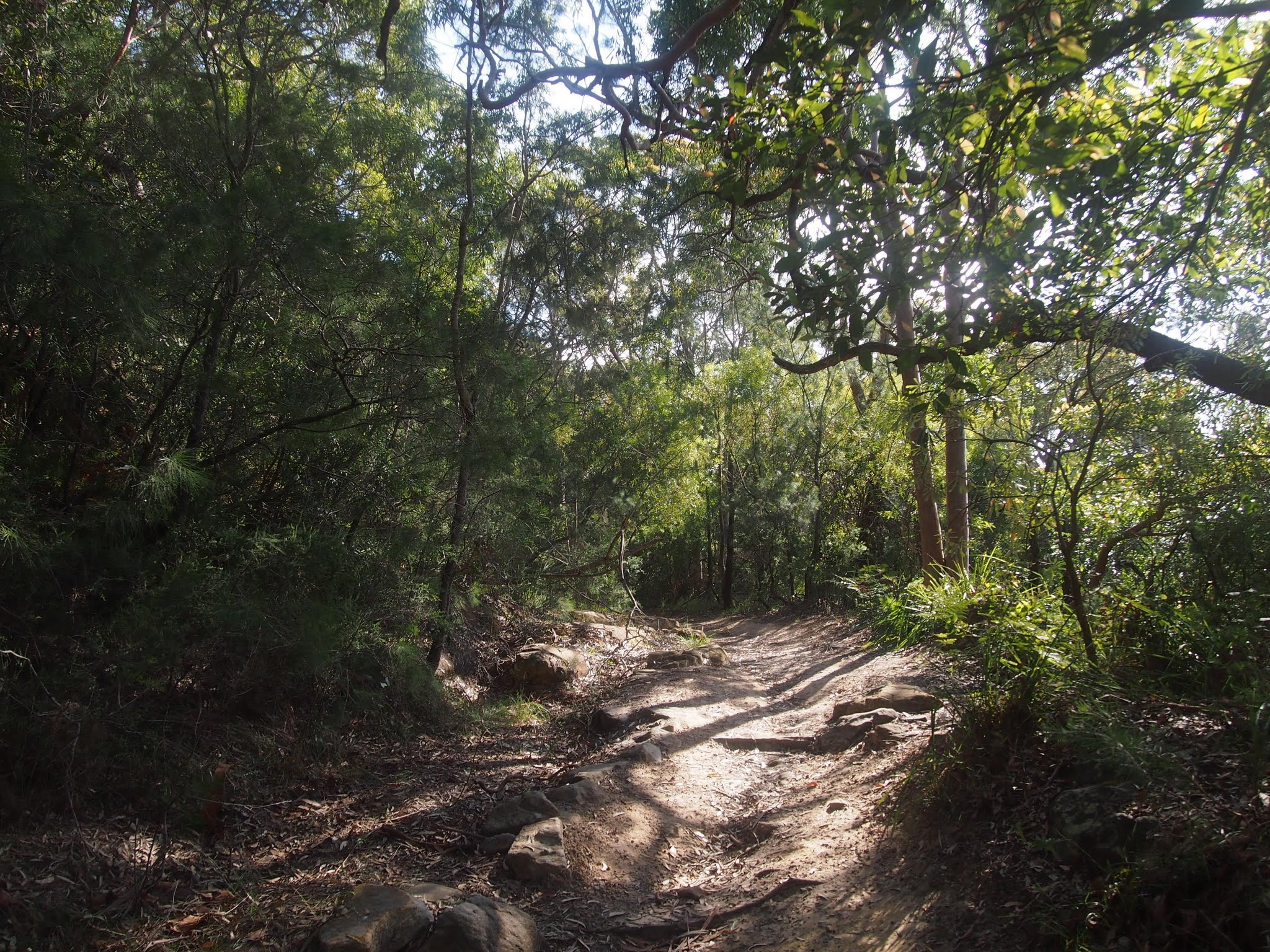
Maianbar NSW 2230, Australia – Panorama #2

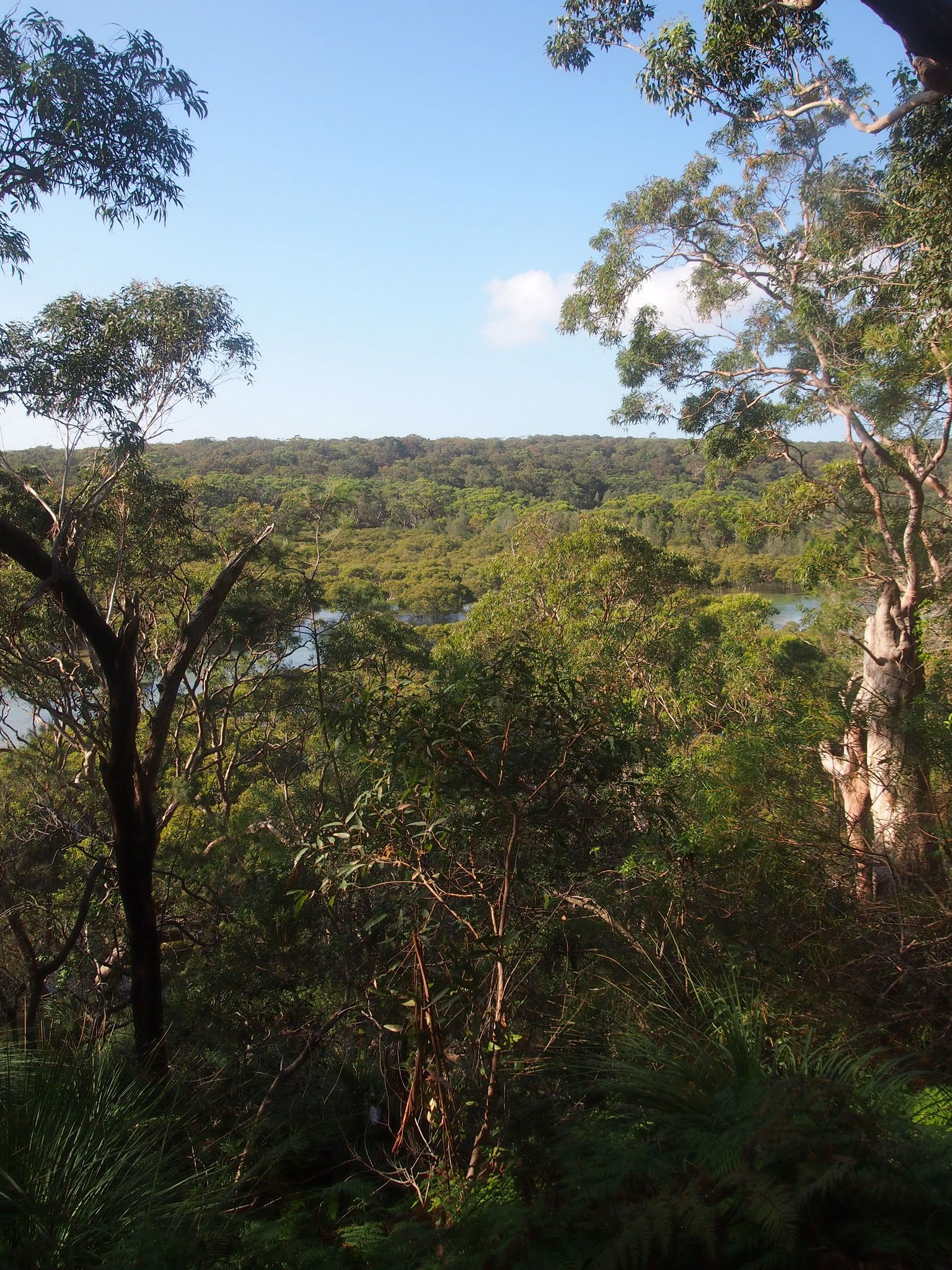
Maianbar NSW 2230, Australia – Panorama #3
