= Gymea =

Gymea may refer to:

- Gymea, New South Wales, a suburb of Sydney, Australia
- Gymea Bay, New South Wales, an adjacent suburb
- the Gymea Lily, a flowering plant indigenous to coastal New South Wales
