= Sydney Montessori School =

Australian independent day school

The Sydney Montessori School (SMS), founded in 1981, is a Montessori, independent, coeducational, secular, day school, located in the suburb of Gymea in Sydney, New South Wales, Australia. The school serves preschool, primary and high school; children ages 0–16. The school was formerly known as the Sutherland Shire Montessori School.

== History ==
The Sydney Montessori School, like many other Australian Montessori schools, was first established by a small group of parents. Established in Grays Point, New South Wales, in 1981, the parents were the school's first administrators, and to help fund the school, parents organised fundraisers and public events with guest speakers. The first classroom was in the home of a local parent in Grays Point under the direction of Kathy Kelly, an American Montessori teacher from Tennessee. The first primary classroom opened in 1989 under the directorship of Elizabeth Catalfamo, an American Montessori teacher. By 2012, the school had established a pre-primary program for toddlers and small children aged 3–6, a primary school for ages 6–9. The school also operates (on site) a separate Montessori Long Day Care (15mths to 6 years). This operates from 7.00 a.m. until 6.00 pm, 48 weeks of the year. The school has seen increased enrolment numbers in recent years, with waiting lists for some year levels.

== Faculty ==
The school's current Principal, Peter MacLean joined the school in 2018 and was formerly Principal of Treetops Montessori School (Perth), a Montessori Primary School and International Baccaluarete high school. Former principals include Elizabeth Catalfamo and Hani Ghali and Raquel Charet. . Former teachers include Felicity Young, Greg McDonald, Elizabeth Piazza and Niamh O'Reilly.

=== Student-teacher ratio ===
The school retains a student-teacher ratio of at least one teacher per every 15 students and with assistants in most classrooms provides a ratio of approximately 1:10.

== ICSEA ranking ==
In 2010, the New South Wales government's index of community socio-economic educational advantage (ICSEA) for the school was 180. The ICSEA ranking is a prediction of the school's score on NAPLAN tests. The rank is based on school data as well as statistical results of the Australian census provided by the Australian Bureau of Statistics (ABS) such as remoteness of school, proportion of Aboriginal students and the average household income in the area where the school is located.

== Sydney International Secondary School ==
The Board and school administration is working towards a possible opening of a high school component: Sydney International Secondary School. It is seeking expressions of interest for a 2021 opening.

== See also ==
- Education in Australia
