= Warumbul =

Locality in New South Wales, Australia

Coordinates: 34.0752°S 151.1028°E

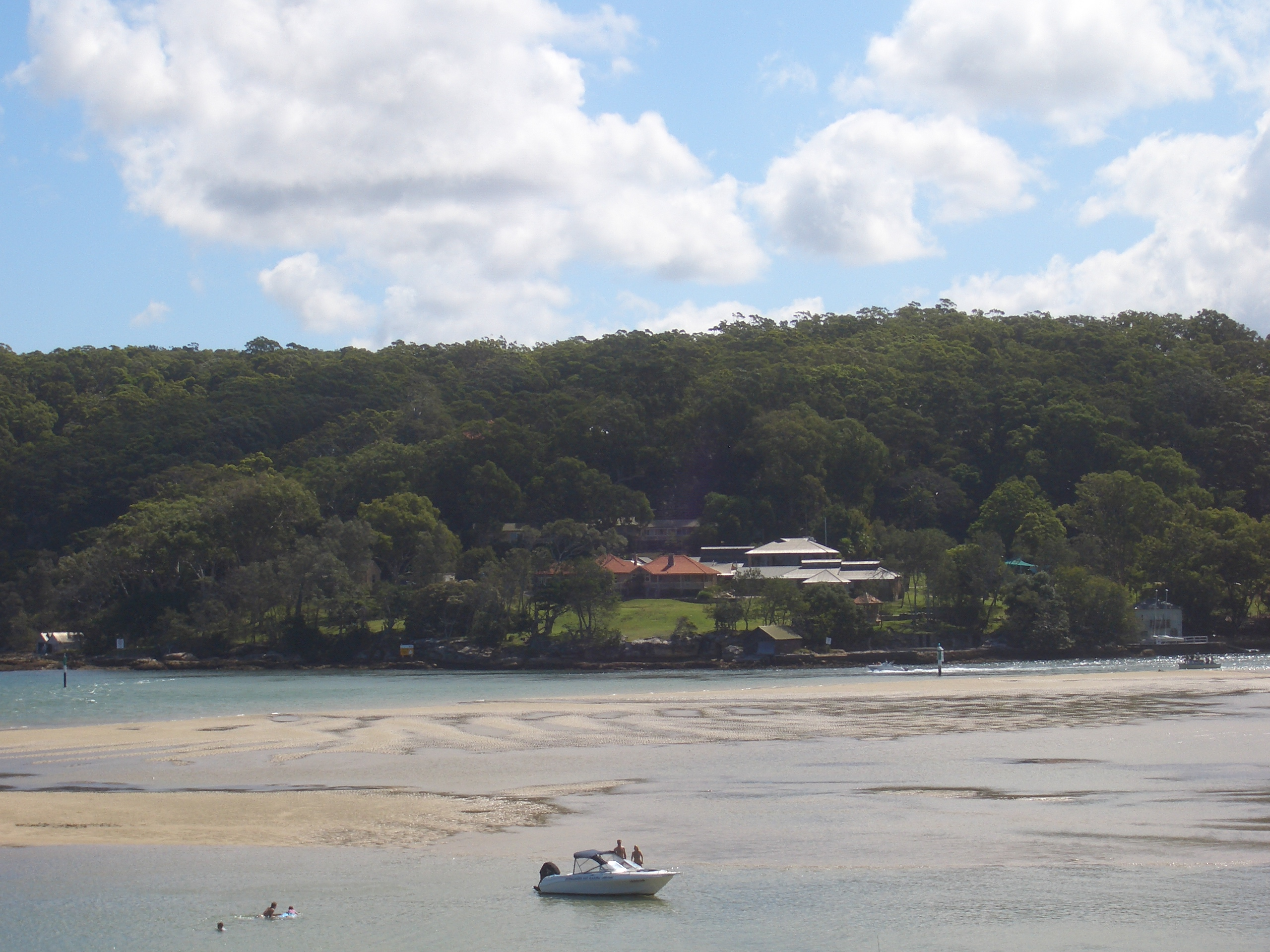
Warumbul viewed from Lilli Pilli

Warumbul is a locality in the Royal National Park on the outskirts of southern Sydney, in the state of New South Wales, Australia. Warumbul is located about 1.5 km southwest of Lilli Pilli on the southern side of Port Hacking.

Warumbul is the site of an Anglican Youth Department Conference Centre operated by Anglican Youthworks.
