= Grays Point, New South Wales =

Grays Point
- Suburb
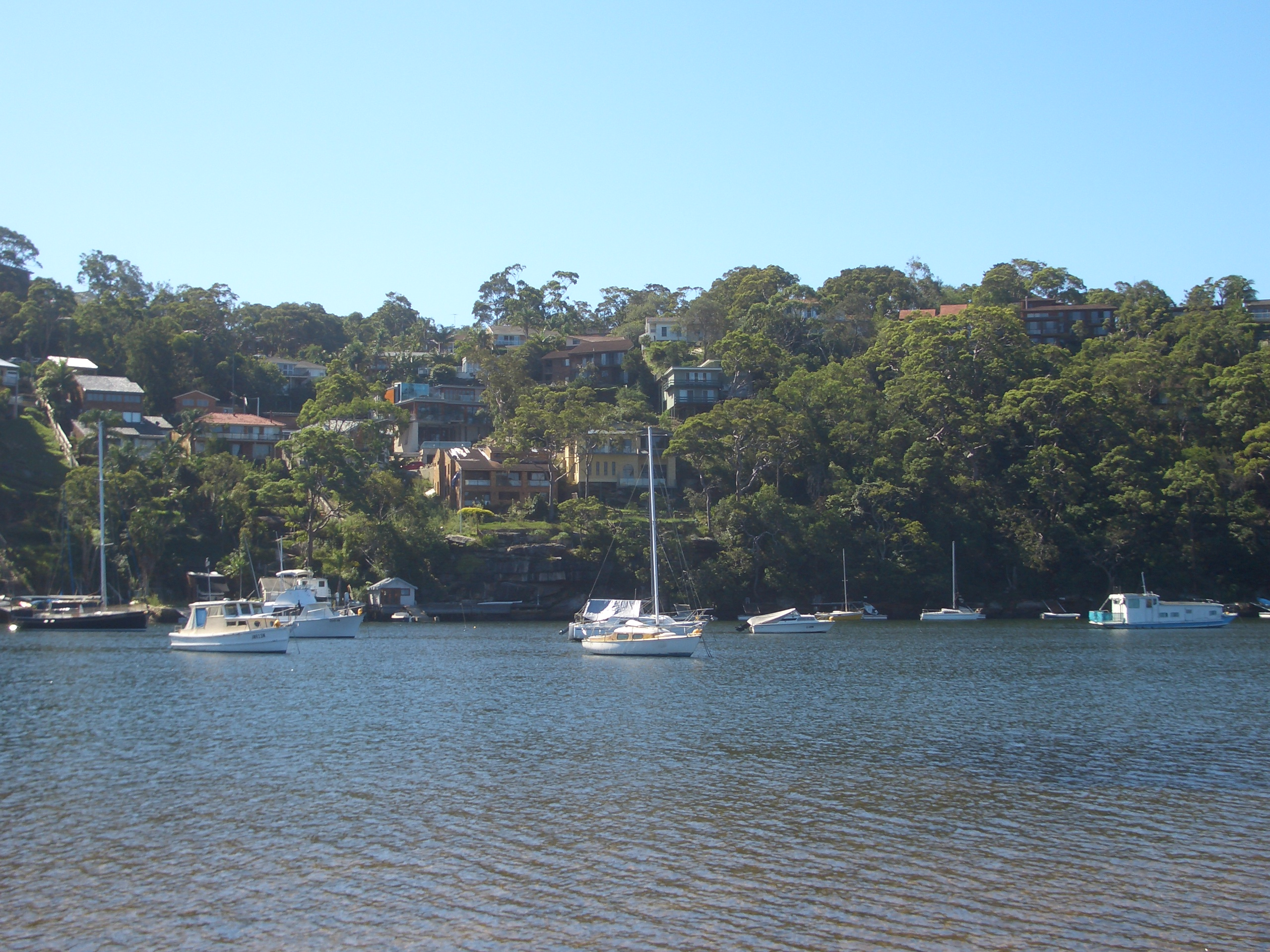
- Mansion Point

- Interactive map of Grays Point
- Coordinates: 34°03′18″S 151°04′30″E
- Country: Australia
- State: New South Wales
- City: Sydney
- LGA: Sutherland Shire
- Location: 29 km (18 mi) S of Sydney CBD

Government
  - State electorate: Cronulla
  - Federal division: Cook
- Elevation: 41 m (135 ft)

Population
  - Total: 3,034 (2021 census)
- Postcode: 2232
Suburbs around Grays Point
Kirrawee	Gymea Bay	Gymea Bay
Royal National Park	Grays Point	Yowie Bay
Royal National Park	Royal National Park	Gundamaian

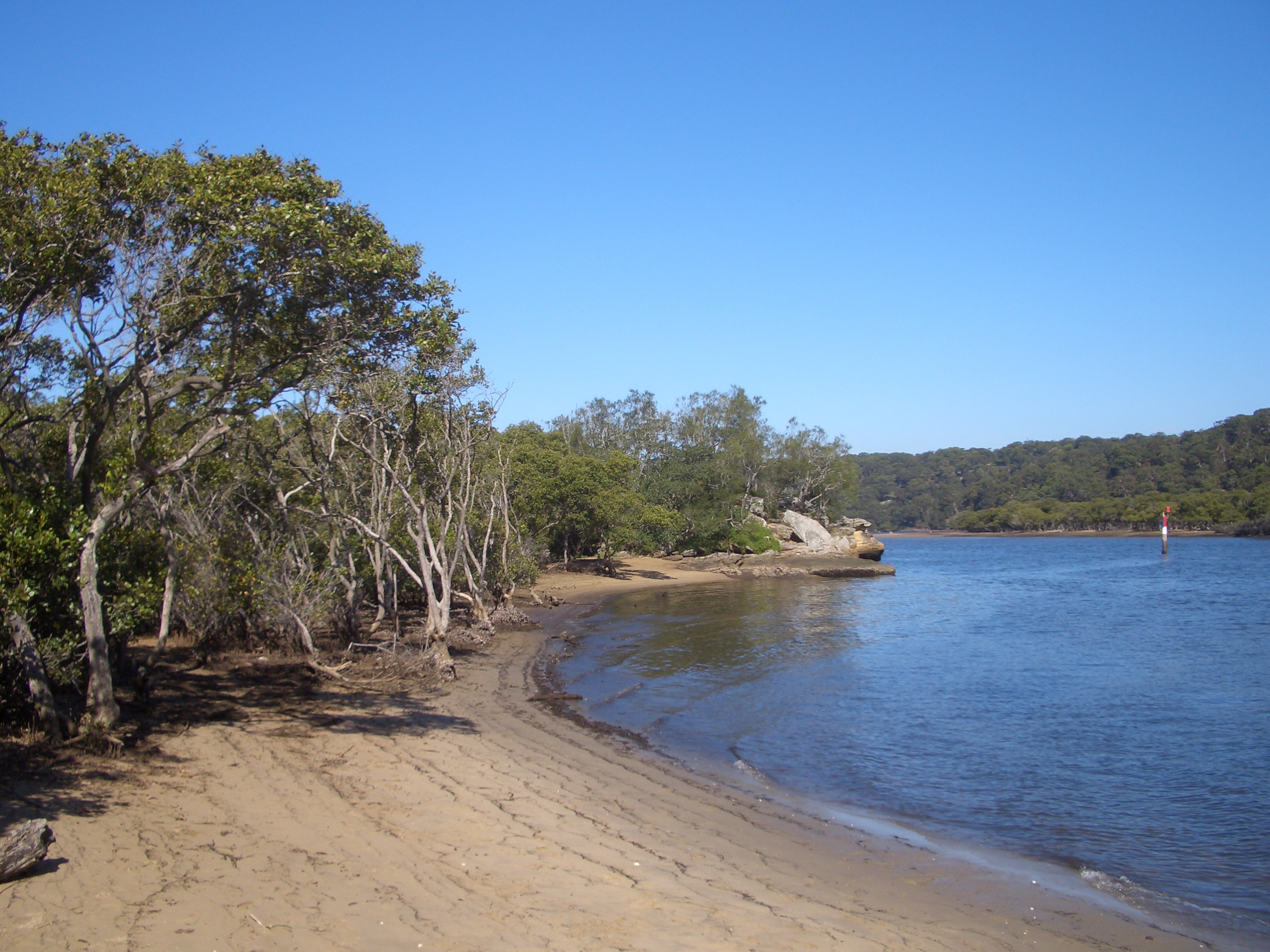
Swallow Rock Reserve

Grays Point is a suburb in Southern Sydney, in the state of New South Wales, Australia 29 kilometres south of the Sydney central business district, in the local government area of the Sutherland Shire.

Grays Point is a small suburb with extensive views of the Port Hacking estuary. Grays Point is adjacent to the Royal National Park and the suburbs of Gymea Bay and Kirrawee. There is only one road available for vehicular access however multiple walking and mountain bike tracks link it with locations such as Audley in the Royal National Park, Engadine and Heathcote. This, in turn, contributes to the exclusive atmosphere of the suburb.

Grays Point house prices are higher than comparable real estate in the southern Sydney region. The median price for a three bedroom house is $1.3m. Properties in the area are tightly held and often remain within families for multiple generations. Houses are highly sought after, especially those with access to the surrounding waterways.

There is a small shallow boat ramp located at Swallow Rock Reserve for launching trailer boats, canoes and kayaks on the Hacking River. Swallow Rock is a wetland area. A large variety of wildlife resides in Grays Point, including possums, sugar gliders, Mopoke owls, deer (an introduced species), wallabies, magpies and kookaburras.

== History ==
The origin of the Grays Point name is unclear. It has been suggested that it was either named after Samuel William Gray, who owned land on the point or John Edward Gray, who was a well-known resident ranger in the Royal National Park in the 1880s.

On 9 January 1983 three volunteer firefighters were killed in a bushfire near Grays Point.

== Population ==
At the 2021 census, there were 3,034 residents in Grays Point. The majority of people were born in Australia and the most common ancestries were English, Australian and Irish. The top responses for religious affiliation were No Religion 42.6%, Catholic 22.6% and Anglican 18.8%. The median household weekly income of $3,061 was substantially higher than the national median of $1,746. The majority of occupied dwellings were separate houses and these tended to be large properties, with 62.1% having 4 or more bedrooms.

== Commercial area ==
Grays Point is largely residential, with a small group of shops located at Grays Point Road, near the intersection of Swallow Rock Drive. A fish and chip shop, a restaurant with a bar, a bottle shop, and a convenience store. Most residents rely on the rest of the Sutherland Shire for their services, especially the retail centres of Gymea, the new shopping precinct at South Village and Miranda

== Schools ==
Grays Point Public School is located in Angle Road. The school lies next to the Grays Point ovals and is cut out of the Royal National Park. The school serves local children from kindergarten to year 6 with around 400 students. It focuses on positive student well being programs and advancing technology skills. Grays Point also has a preschool and a child care centre.

== Sport ==
Grays Point Soccer Club located next to the Public School, the club has Junior and Senior teams. The club has two playing fields. They are also used as a cricket field during the summer months.
