= Yowie Bay =

- Suburb
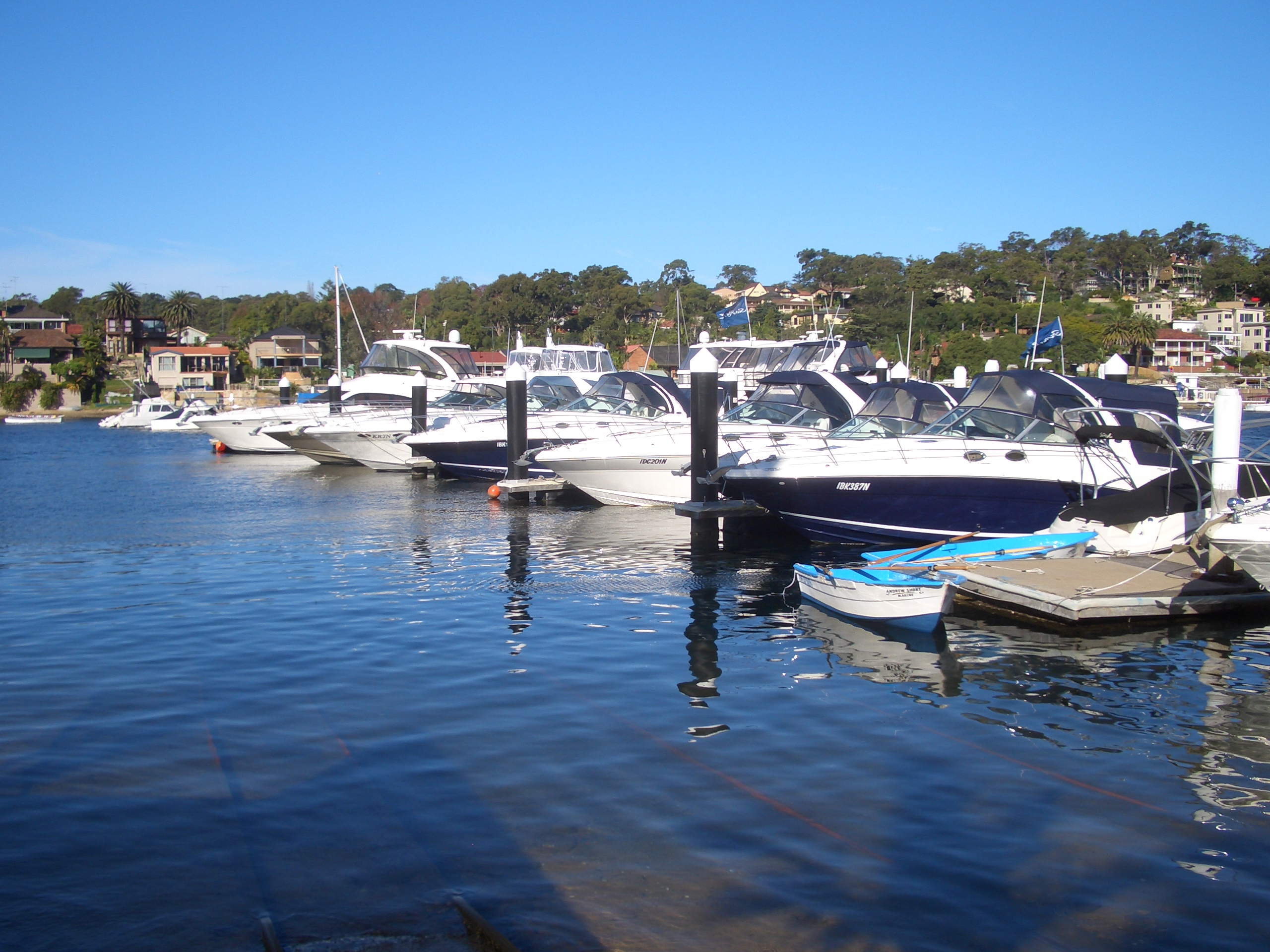
- Yowie Bay marina

- Interactive map of Yowie Bay
- Coordinates: 34°02′59″S 151°06′12″E
- Country: Australia
- State: New South Wales
- City: Sydney
- LGA: Sutherland Shire
- Location: 24 km (15 mi) south of Sydney CBD
- Established: 1889

Government
  - State electorates: Cronulla; Miranda
  - Federal division: Cook
- Elevation: 28 m (92 ft)

Population
  - Total: 3,053 (SAL 2021)
- Postcode: 2228
Suburbs around Yowie Bay
Gymea	Miranda	Caringbah
Gymea Bay	Yowie Bay	Caringbah South
Grays Point	Royal National Park	Lilli Pilli

Yowie Bay is a suburb in southern Sydney, in the state of New South Wales, Australia. Yowie Bay is located 24 kilometres south of the Sydney central business district, in the local government area of the Sutherland Shire.

Yowie Bay takes its name from the small bay on the north shore of the Port Hacking estuary (also known locally as the Port Hacking River). It is bounded to the north by the suburb of Miranda and shares its postcode of 2228. Located to the east, across the Yowie Bay waterway, is Caringbah South. To the west is the suburb of Gymea Bay, across the bay of the same name.

== History ==
The name for the waterway Ewey Bay first appears in an 1827 map by surveyor Robert Dixon. As Dixon had labelled other localities around Port Hacking with Aboriginal names, it is assumed that Ewey was Dixon's recording of the Aboriginal name too.

Land in the area was released as the Village of Weerona in 1889. The spelling Yowie first appears around the same time.

In an 1890 newspaper letter to the editor, Richard Hill claimed the meaning of Yowie was "Cooee". Referring to Yowie Point, he claimed that there "the blacks, when travelling north, used to cooey to their friends on the north, and were brought over in the canoes..." The word "yowi" also appeared as "echo of a cooee" on a list of Aboriginal words collected in 1899 by the Anthropological Society of Australasia, in the Liverpool (police) district, which had earlier included the current Sutherland Shire area. There appears to be no relationship to the mythical Australian creature called a Yowie.

It is however unclear why both Ewey and Yowie were in use. According to one suggestion, Ewey might have been associated with ewes when sheep were run in the area in the 1860s. Some of the workers with various accents might have pronounced "ewe" as "yow" and thus introduced the pronunciation Yowie.

As reported by local newspapers, the Sutherland Shire Council attempted to establish Ewey Bay as the correct name. However, the suburb was officially assigned the name Yowie Bay in 1973 by the Geographical Names Board.

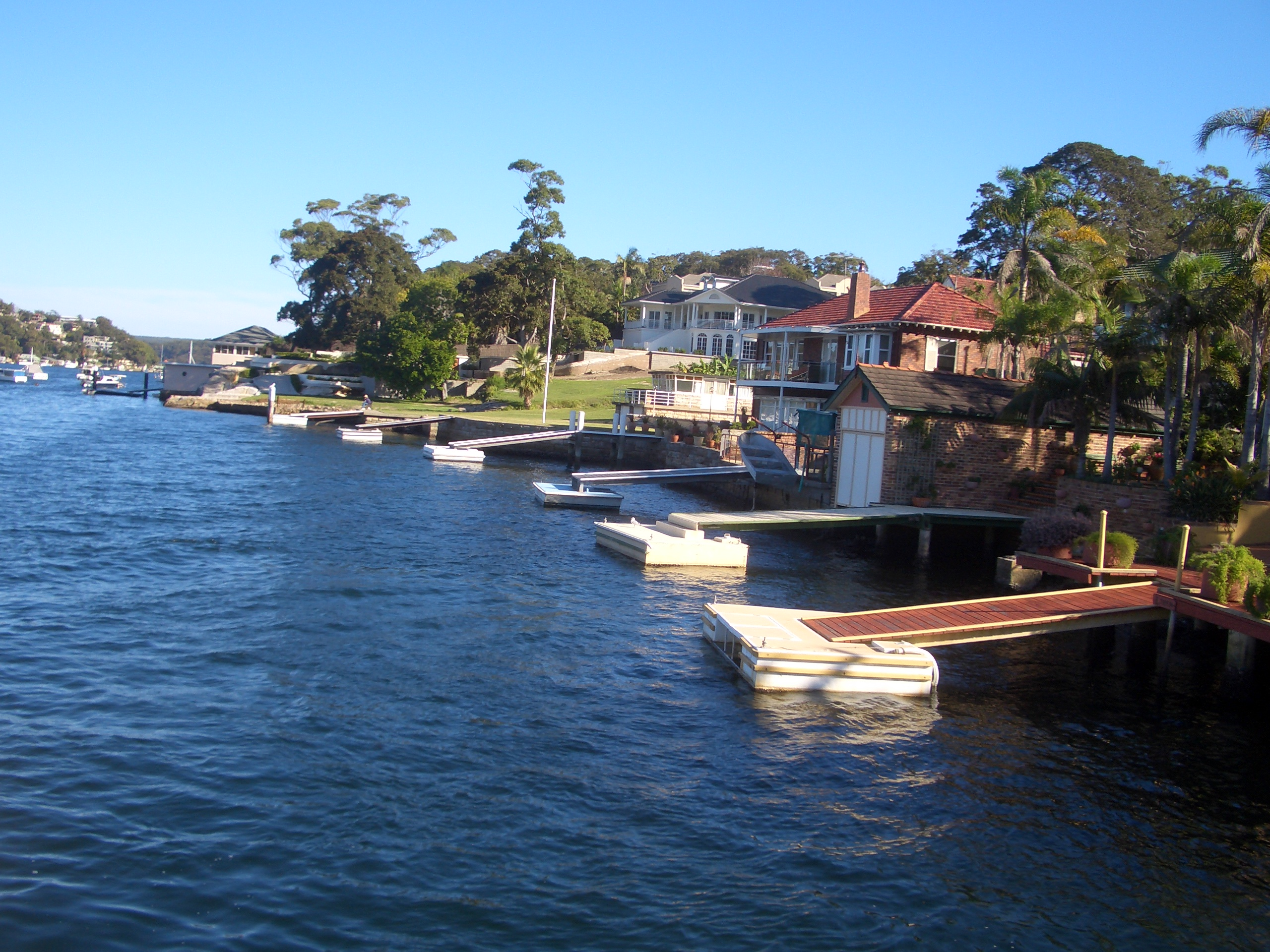
Yowie Bay homes and jetties

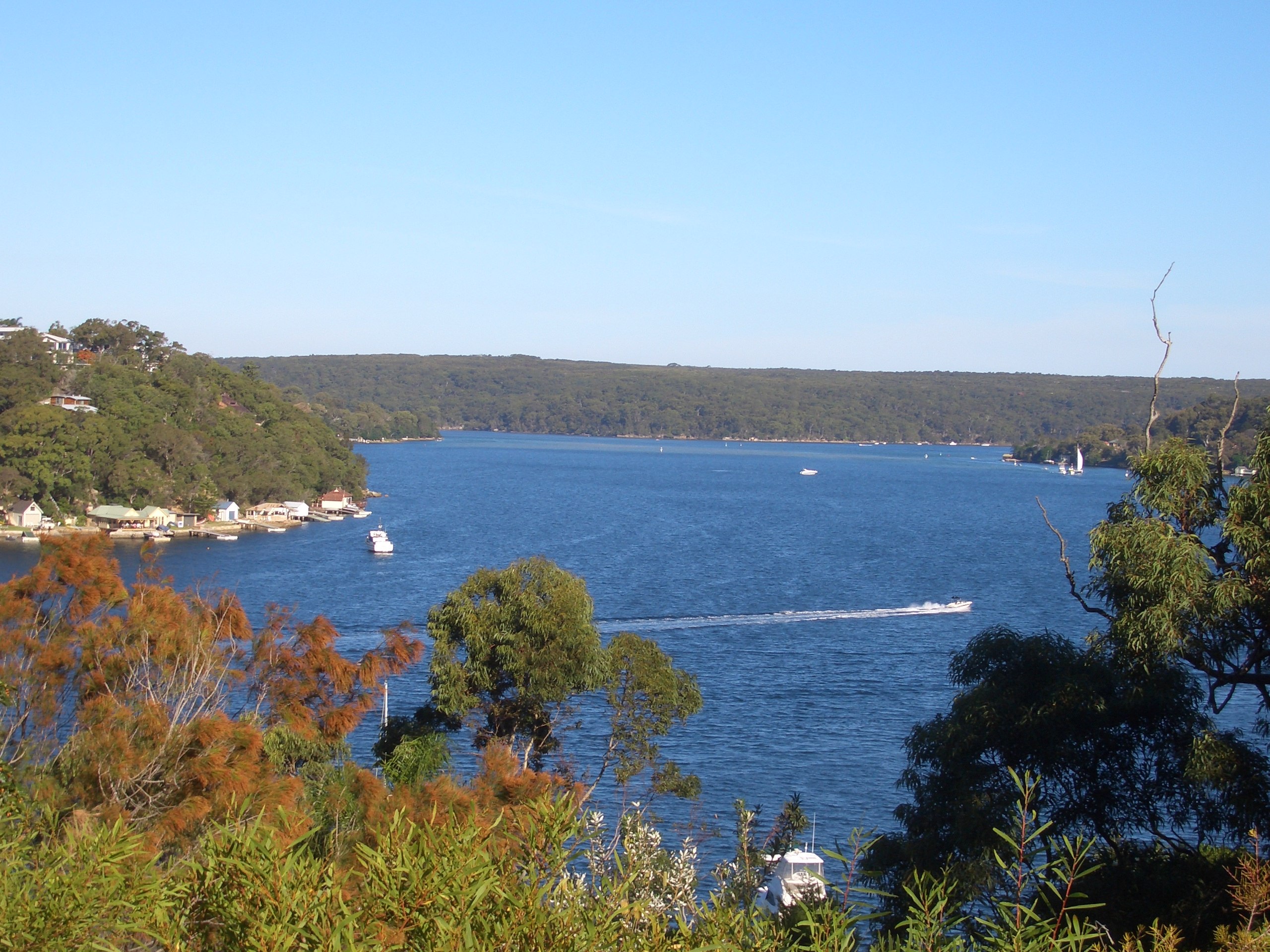
Yowie Bay view towards Port Hacking

== Amenities ==
Yowie Bay is a mostly residential area with a few scattered commercial developments, including a grocer and café. A marina is located at the end of Wonga Road with a liquor shop nearby. There is a local grocer The Port Hacking Open Sailing Club sits on Yowie Bay. There is one small school, Yowie Bay Public School.

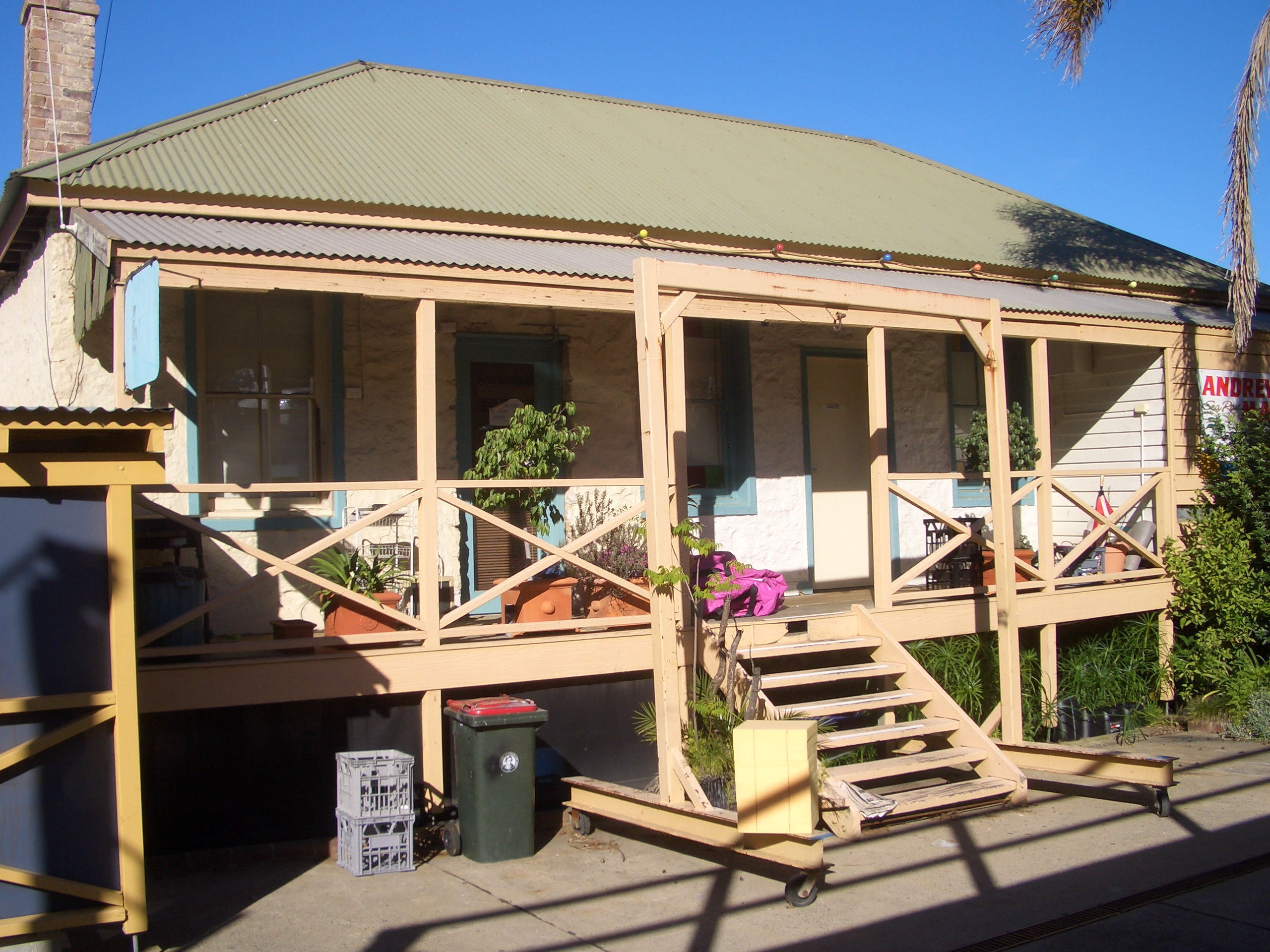
Yowie Bay marina

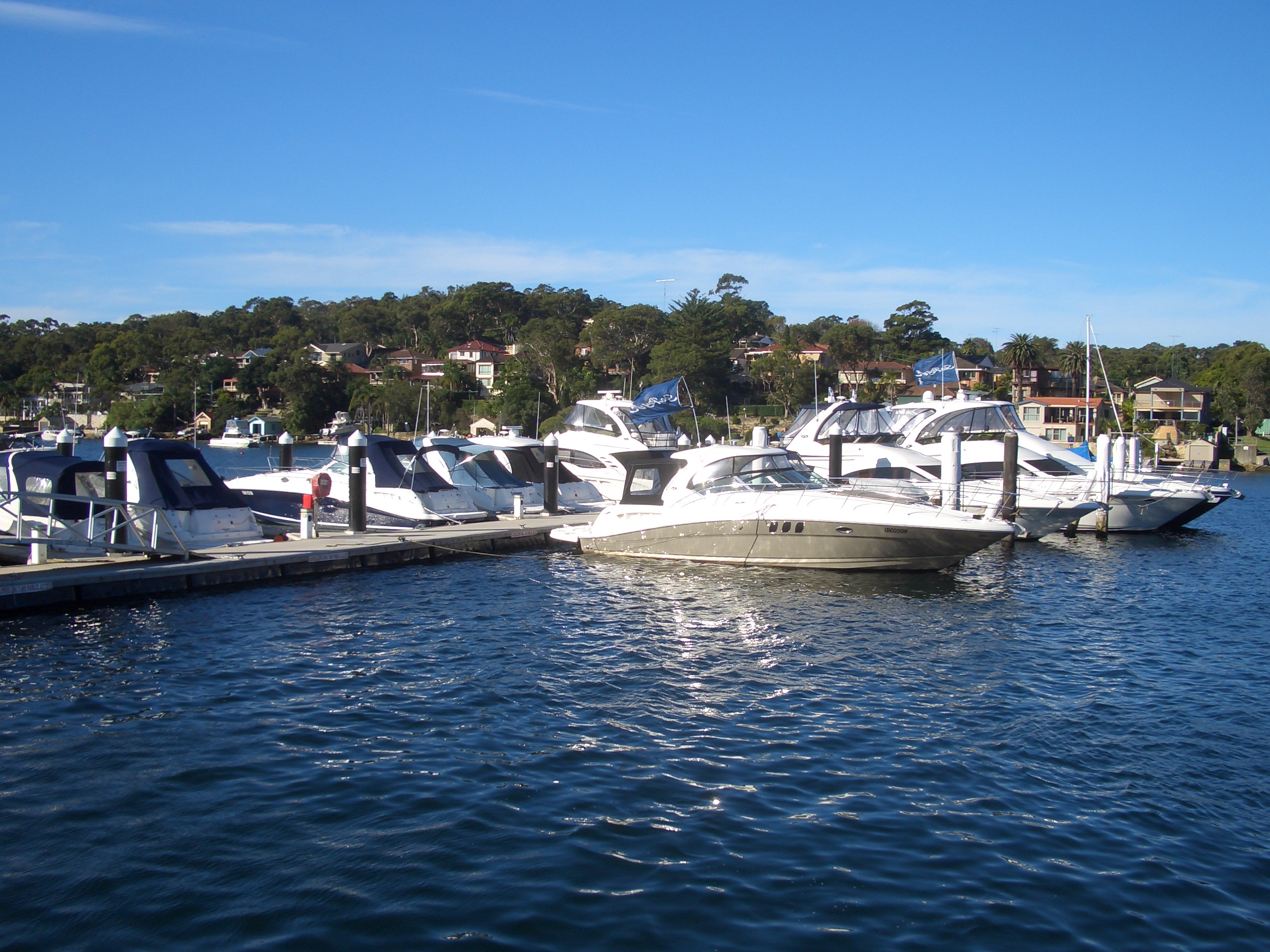
Yowie Bay marina

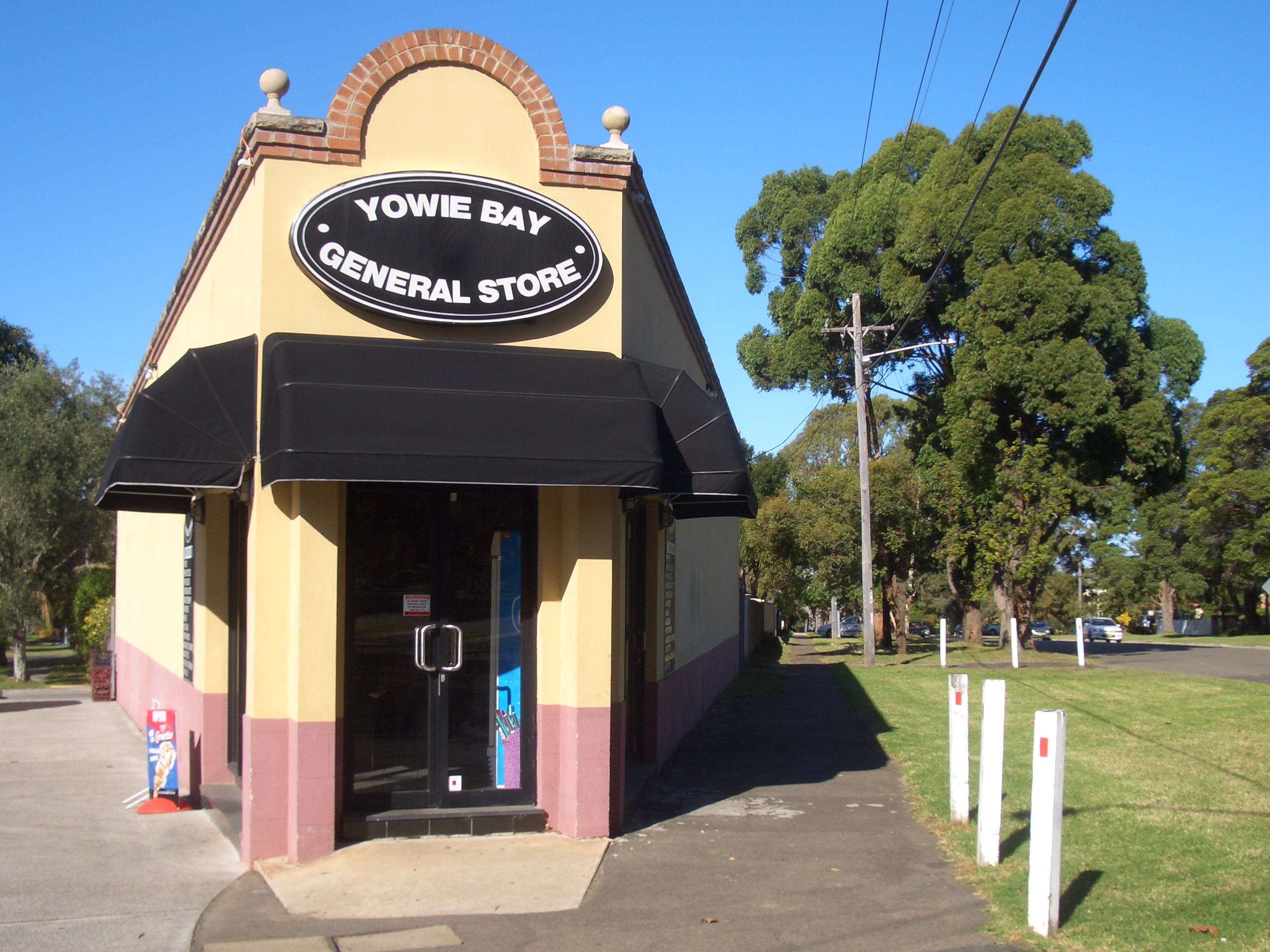
Yowie Bay general store
