= Port Hacking =

Estuary in southern Sydney, Australia

Port Hacking Estuary
- Deeban (Dharawal)
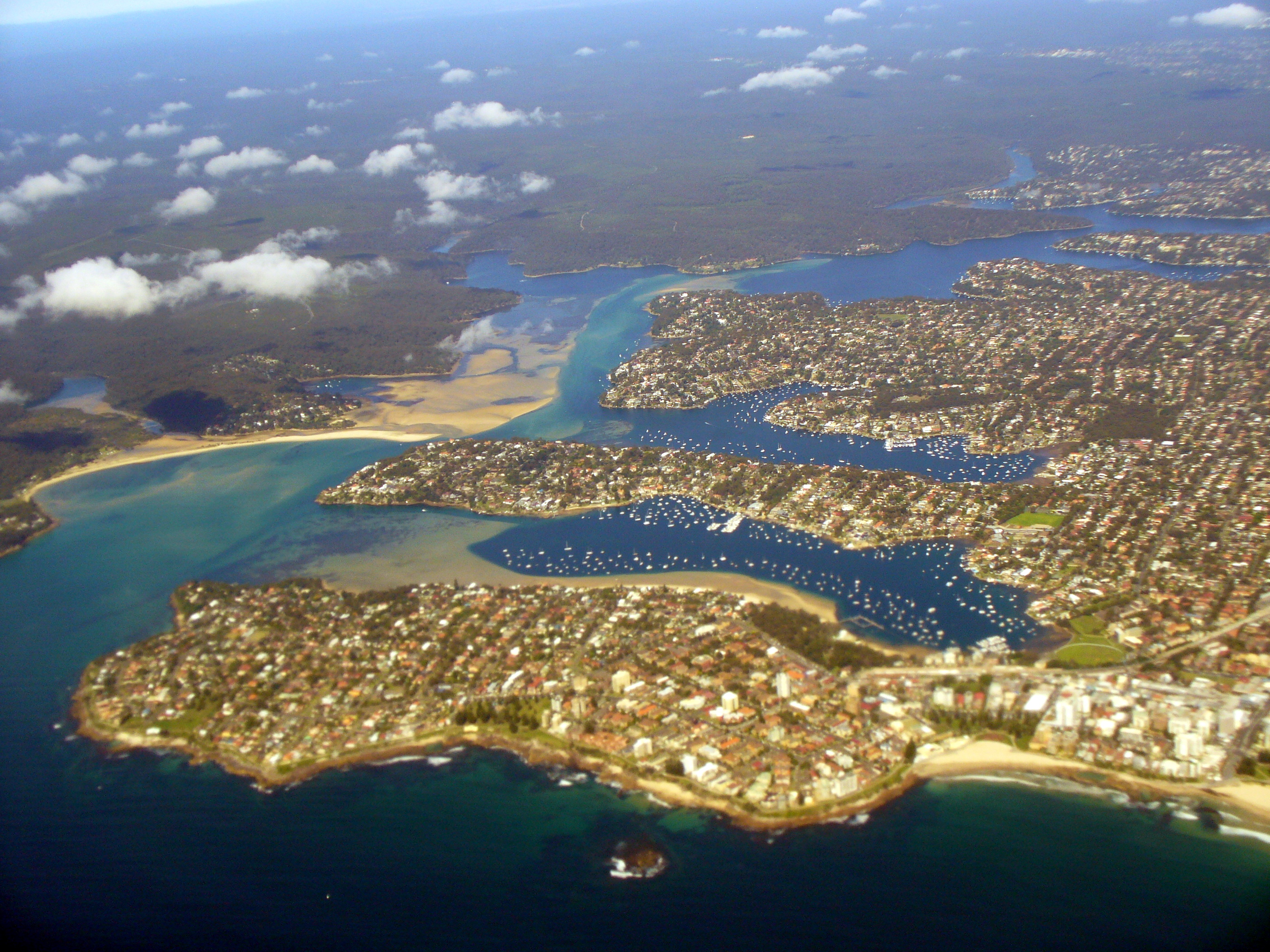
- Looking inland over Port Hacking estuary towards the west from the Tasman Sea.

- Location of Port Hacking in Sydney, New South Wales

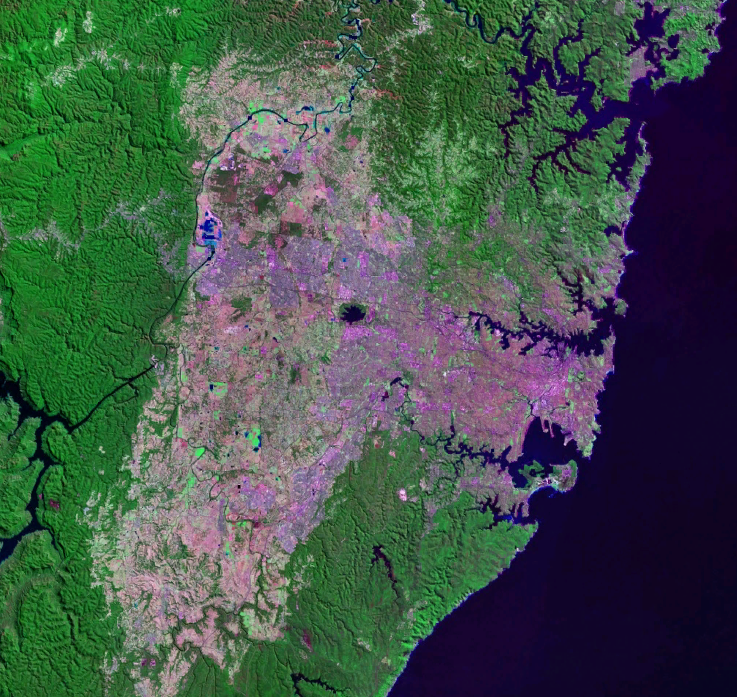
- Port Hacking, the southernmost inlet shown on a 2005 NASA image of the urban sprawl of Greater Sydney
- Location: Southern Sydney, New South Wales
- Coordinates: 34°03′55″S 151°08′05″E
- Type: An open youthful tide dominated, drowned valley estuary
- Etymology: in honour of Henry Hacking, a pilot at Port Jackson
- Primary inflows: Hacking River
- Primary outflows: Tasman Sea
- Catchment area: 165.3 km^{2} (63.8 sq mi)
- Basin countries: Australia
- Managing agency: Sutherland Shire Council,
- Surface area: 11.7 km^{2} (4.5 sq mi)
- Average depth: 9.1 m (30 ft)
- Water volume: 105,261.5 km^{3} (8.53369×10^{10} acre⋅ft)
- Frozen: never
- Settlements: Bundeena, Cronulla, Woolooware, Burraneer, Caringbah South, Dolans Bay, Port Hacking, Lilli Pilli, Yowie Bay, Miranda, Gymea Bay, Grays Point
- Website: NSW Environment and Heritage webpage

Port Hacking Estuary (Aboriginal Tharawal language: Deeban), an open youthful tide dominated, drowned valley estuary, is located in southern Sydney, New South Wales, Australia approximately 30 kilometres (19 mi) south of Sydney central business district. Port Hacking has its source in the upper reaches of the Hacking River south of Helensburgh, and several smaller creeks, including South West Arm, Bundeena Creek and The Basin and flows generally to the east before reaching its mouth, the Tasman Sea, south of Cronulla and north–east of Bundeena. Its tidal effect is terminated at the weir at Audley, in the Royal National Park. The lower estuary features a substantial marine delta, which over time has prograded upstream. There is also a substantial fluvial (riverine delta) of the Hacking River at Grays Point. The two deltas are separated by a deep basin.

The total catchment area of Port Hacking is approximately 165 square kilometres (64 sq mi) and the area surrounding the estuary is generally managed by Sutherland Shire Council. While the area to the north of Port Hacking is urbanised, the area to the south is relatively pristine and forms the northern boundary of the Royal National Park.

The land adjacent to Port Hacking was occupied for many thousands of years by the Tharawal and Eora, both Aboriginal peoples, and their associated clans. They used the bay as an important source of food and a place for trade.

== History ==
=== Aboriginal history ===
For more than 8,000 years prior to 1840, the Tharawal (or Dharawal) people occupied the catchment area evidenced by hundreds of Aboriginal artefacts, middens, rock carvings and cave paintings. In the mid-19th century shell grit was in high demand as a source of lime for building in the Sydney district. Consequently, mud and oyster rocks were collected in large numbers from Port Hacking catchment, destroying a number of Aboriginal midden sites in the region.

=== European history ===
Matthew Flinders and George Bass (with Bass's servant William "The Boy" Martin) explored the area in early April 1796. They called it Port Hacking after Henry Hacking, the principal game hunter in the colony who first told the explorers of a large river he had seen inland on kangaroo hunting expeditions. Hacking was convicted of murder some years after the naming, but the name was retained.

European impacts have been substantial: the river has been effectively dammed at Audley, the dynamics of the frontal part of the marine delta were substantially altered by the creation of a fish hatchery at The Basin, shell grit extraction decimated large seagrass beds, and the entire northern shore is urbanised. Port Hacking has been closed to commercial fishing for about a century, and there are other catch/harvesting closures throughout the Port.

The northern headland, located at Cronulla, is called Bass and Flinders Point.

== Description ==
Port Hacking effectively forms the southern boundary of Sydney's suburban sprawl. Working inland from the sea, the indented north bank of Port Hacking is formed by the suburbs of Cronulla, Woolooware, Burraneer, Caringbah South, Dolans Bay, Port Hacking, Lilli Pilli, Yowie Bay, Miranda, Gymea Bay and Grays Point. The southern bank is largely undeveloped land within the Royal National Park, although the small communities of Bundeena and Maianbar are found there. Warumbul and Gundamaian are other localities on the southern bank, in the Royal National Park. Cronulla and National Park Ferry Cruises operates a regular passenger ferry service that crosses Port Hacking, connecting Cronulla and its railway station to Bundeena. They also operate cruises along Port Hacking that depart from Cronulla.

Port Hacking is a drowned river valley, with a water surface area of 11 square kilometres (4.2 sq mi). With very little industrial and minor agricultural inputs via the Hacking River, the water quality is categorised as 'extremely good', and the extensive inter-tidal shoals provide opportunity for wading birds.

Port Hacking is a popular recreational area, where many activities can be enjoyed such as swimming, fishing and boating. The estuary and bays are used for watersports such as wakeboarding and water skiing and scuba diving. The distinctive shore feature, Shiprock, sits above the only aquatic reserve in Port Hacking. It has been protected because of the unique micro environment of marine fauna and flora.

== Gallery ==
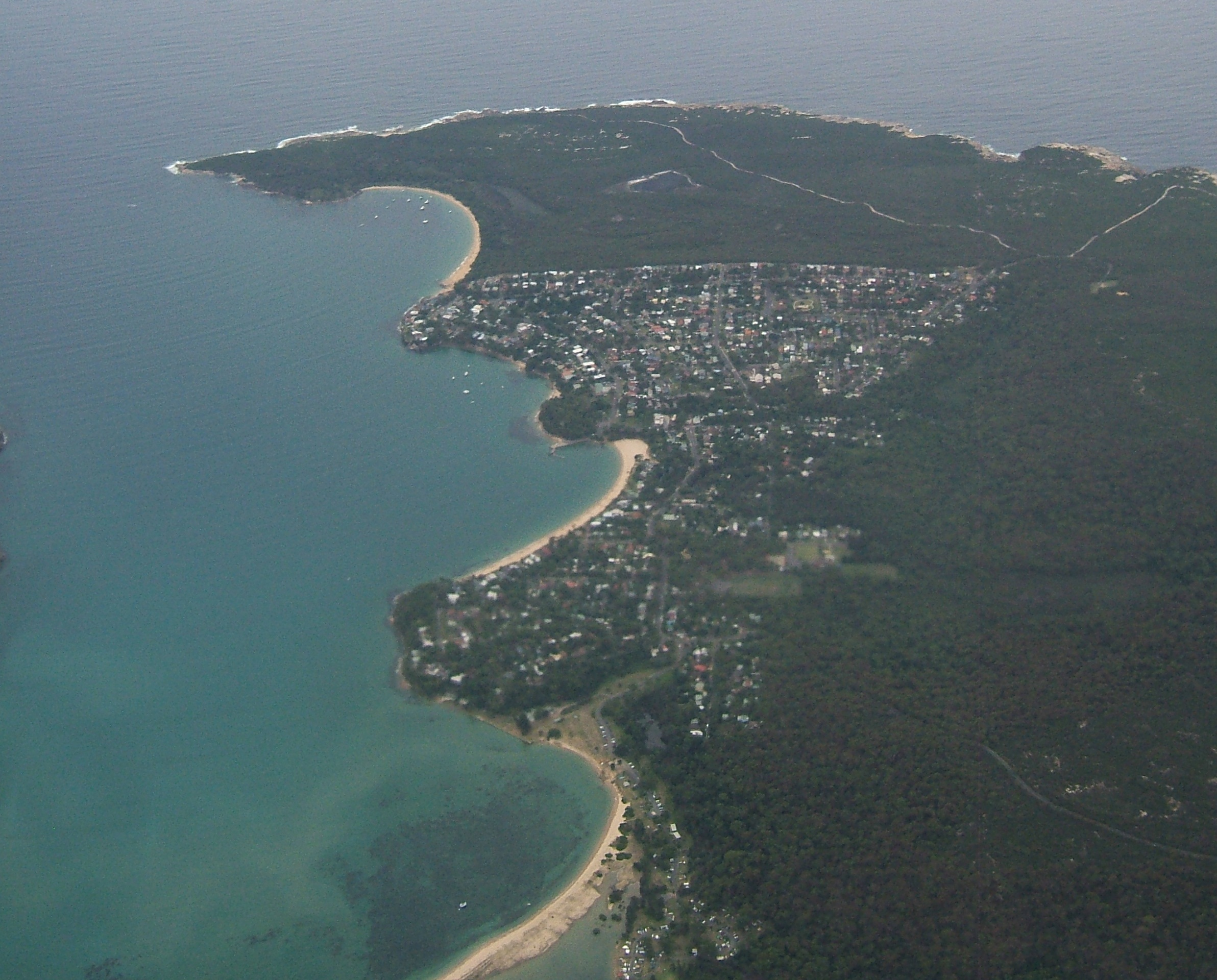
Aerial view of Bundeena and Port Hacking

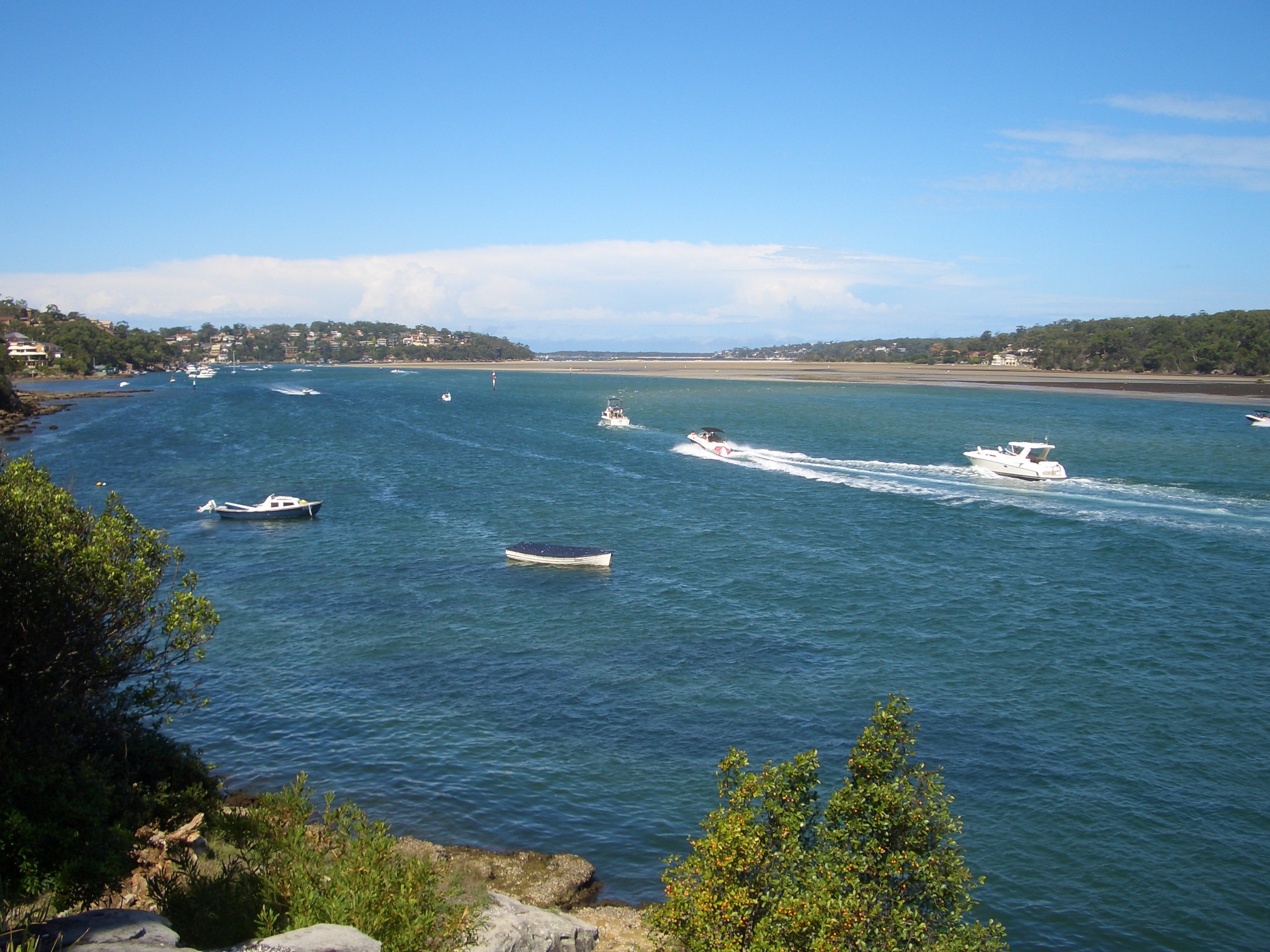
Port Hacking estuary near Burraneer

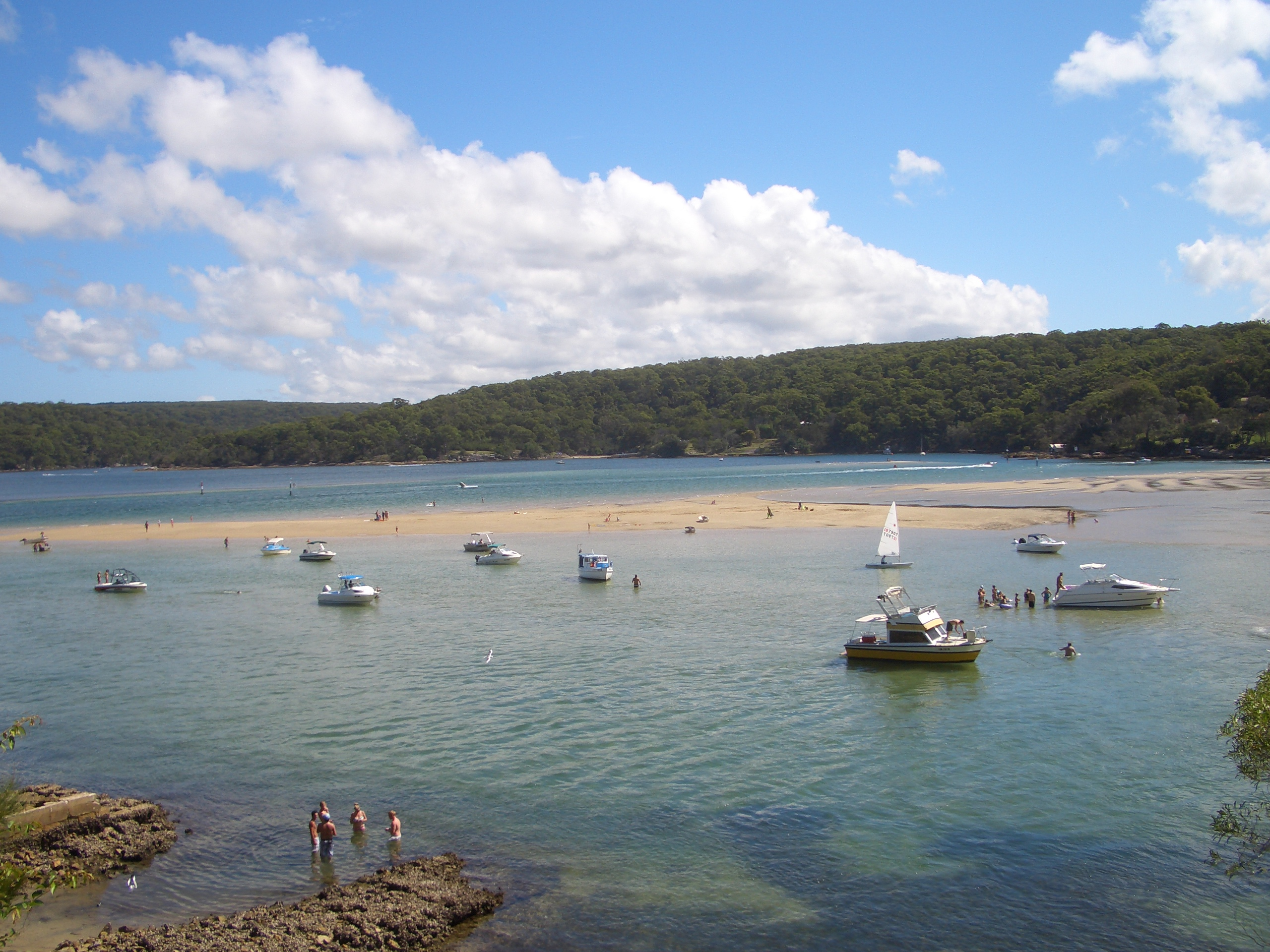
Port Hacking estuary at Lilli Pilli

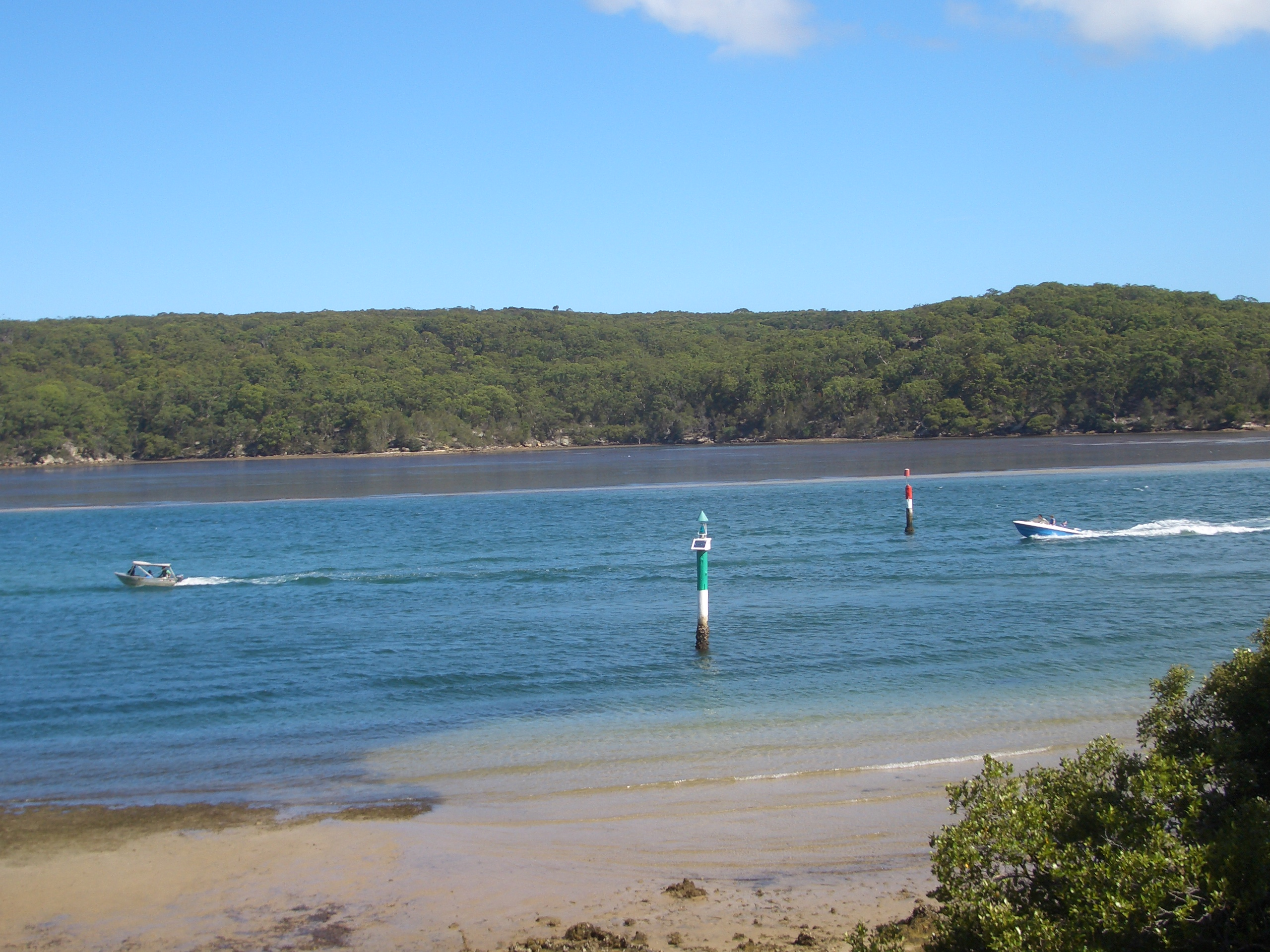
Port Hacking estuary at Lilli Pilli

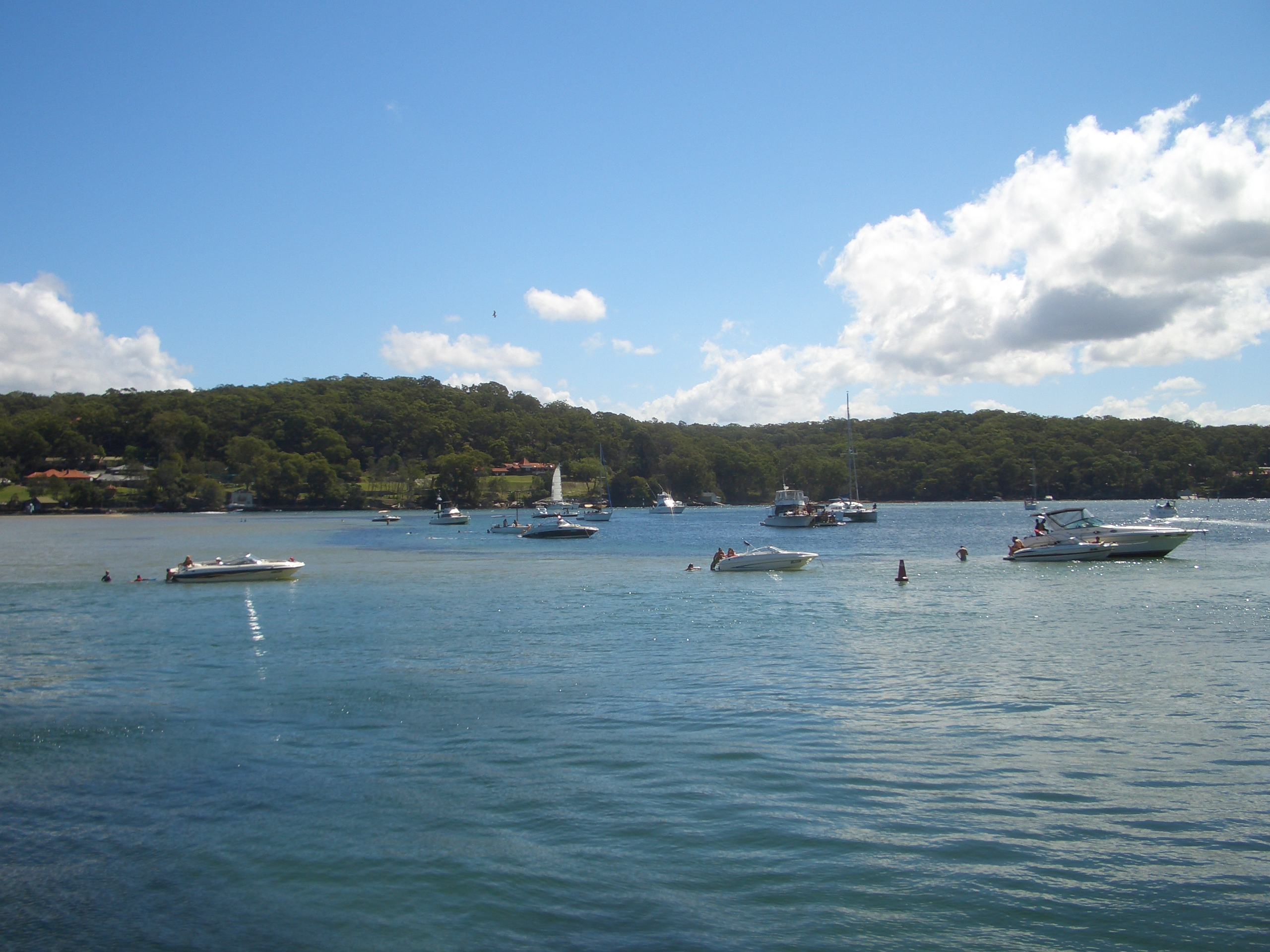
Port Hacking estuary near Warumbul

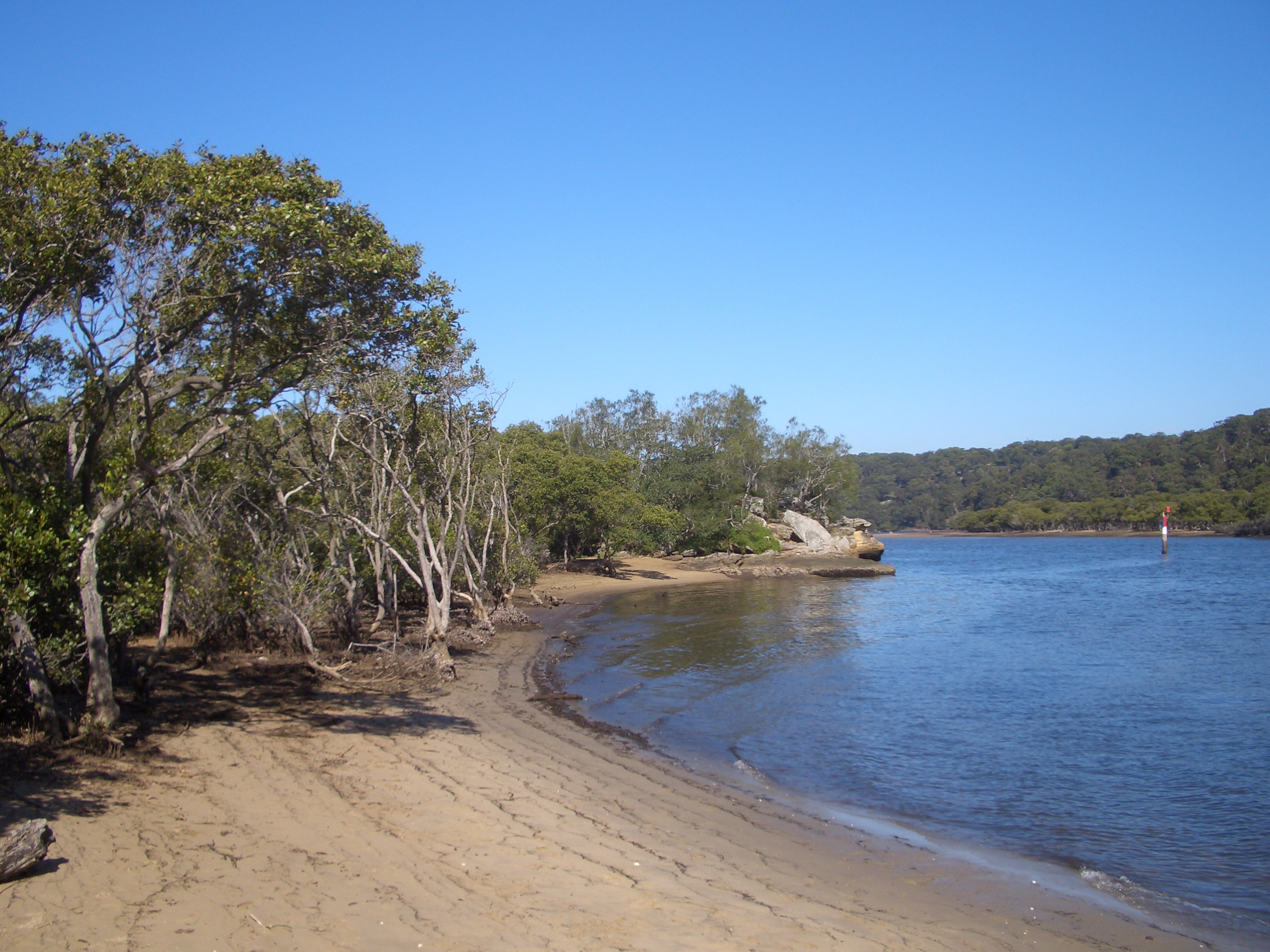
Port Hacking estuary at Grays Point
