= Anglican Youthworks =

Christian non profit organisation in Australia

- Formation: 1998
- Purpose: An effective youth ministry in every church
- Headquarters: Sydney
- Region served: New South Wales
- Key people: Craig Roberts (CEO)
- Website: youthworks.net

Anglican Youthworks is an Australian Christian not-for-profit organisation based in Sydney. Youthworks oversees three divisions, each of which contributes to the organisation's mission: to support the teaching of the gospel in schools and churches, particularly to families. It was formed in 1998, to avoid duplication of resources, by merging the Diocese of Sydney's Anglican Youth Department with the Anglican Education Commission:(

== History ==
The Anglican Youth Department of the Sydney Diocese was formed by Archbishop Howard Mowll, who appointed Graham Delbridge its first Director of Youth Work in 1942. Delbridge was responsible for significant growth in diocesan youth ministry, particularly in the purchase of sites along the Hacking River for the welfare of returned servicemembers and youth camps. Delbridge resigned in 1952, and was succeeded by Neville Bathgate four years later.

Bathgate, inspired by Christian camps in Canada, the United States and the United Kingdom, established the similar Camp Howard in 1956. Fifteen hundred children were attending the December camps by 1960; divided into boys', girls' and junior camps, they featured swimming, sailing, canoeing, archery, riflery and arts and crafts.

The Port Hacking sites were developed and expanded, and new sites were opened at Springwood, in the Kosciuszko National Park, Gerroa and Shoalhaven. Programs for troubled and disabled youths and mid-week school camps were introduced. By 1990, 25,000 young people attended Anglican Youth Department camps.

Around the time that Bathgate was establishing the camping ministry at Port Hacking, Alan Langdon was appointed as director of education for the Anglican Education Commission. Langdon was involved in the development of the original special religious education (SRE) policy, scripture lessons for schools and churches, teacher training, and low-fee Anglican schools. As part of the Anglican Board of Education, he worked with other denominations and religious groups to produce a report which convinced the government to incorporate SRE into the 1990 NSW Education Act.

During the mid-1990s, the Anglican Youth Department and the Anglican Education Commission investigated the idea of providing theological training of children's and youth ministers for local churches. In 1997, the department and commission began negotiating a merger under the Youth Department acting director Stuart Abrahams. Anglican Youthworks resulted the following year.

In 1997, Youthworks College was formed at Camp Wanawong in Loftus; the campus was opened to students three years later. The college began offering a gap year program and a Year 13 diploma in 2006, and long-distance online study in 2009. In 2017, the college was moved to the Moore College campus in Newtown to enable expansion.

== Divisions ==
=== Outdoor education ===
Youthworks runs holiday programs for primary-aged children, disabled youths, and HSC students. They provide programs for school camps and facilities which include Youthworks activities and sites.

Youthworks sites
Name	Location	Capacity
Chaldercot	Port Hacking	54
Rathane	Port Hacking	120
Deer Park	Port Hacking	140
Telford	Port Hacking	68
Waterslea	Shoalhaven	167
Koloona	Shoalhaven	67
Riverview	Shoalhaven	22
Lawrence Lodge	Shoalhaven	14
Blue Gum Lodge	Springwood	100
Clifton Cottage	Moreton National Park	12
Southern Cross Alpine Lodge	Kosciusko National Park	25
Wanawong	Loftus	47

=== Media ===
Youthworks supplies resources for children's, youth and family ministries in schools and churches. Christian Education Publications (CEP) provides primary and secondary curricula for use in Special Religious Education (SRE) classes in New South Wales, and are used by a number of Protestant denominations in Australia and New Zealand. Its Connect curriculum was reviewed in Queensland in 2016, when a primary-school principal became concerned that the material was proselytizing his students and halted all religious instruction in his school. According to the state government review of the curricula, "the vast majority of Connect materials align with the Department of Education and Training's legislation, policies, procedures or frameworks". Concerns were raised about content considered inappropriate for the target audience, such as references to (or activities relating to) animal sacrifice, murder, sex roles, and keeping secrets. Some advice given to instructors was inconsistent with contemporary education practices, particularly in relation to Aboriginal and Torres Strait Islander students and students with disabilities. In response to the report, CEP affirmed their willingness to improve their resources and make suggested edits. CEP curricula are "Beginning with God" (ages 4–5), "Connect" (ages 5–12), "Big Questions" (ages 11–12) and "Think Faith" (school years 7-10)

Anglican Press Australia (APA) primarily publish resources for Anglican church leaders, such as Common Prayer (for use in corporate worship) and Leadership on the Front Foot by Zachary Veron (Youthworks CEO from 2007 to 2017). Growing Faith (an online newsletter for Christian parents), APA and Aquila Press are part of CEP.

=== Training ===
Youthworks provide training for children's and youth ministries. They supply accreditation courses for new Anglican SRE teachers and sponsor training events and conferences for teachers.
