= Gundamaian =

Place in Sutherland Shire, New South Wales, Australia

Coordinates: 34°04′S 151°05′E

Gundamaian is a locality in the Royal National Park on the outskirts of southern Sydney, in the state of New South Wales, Australia. It is located about 2.5 km southeast of Gymea Bay on the southern side of Port Hacking.
