= Gymea, New South Wales =

Gymea
- Suburb
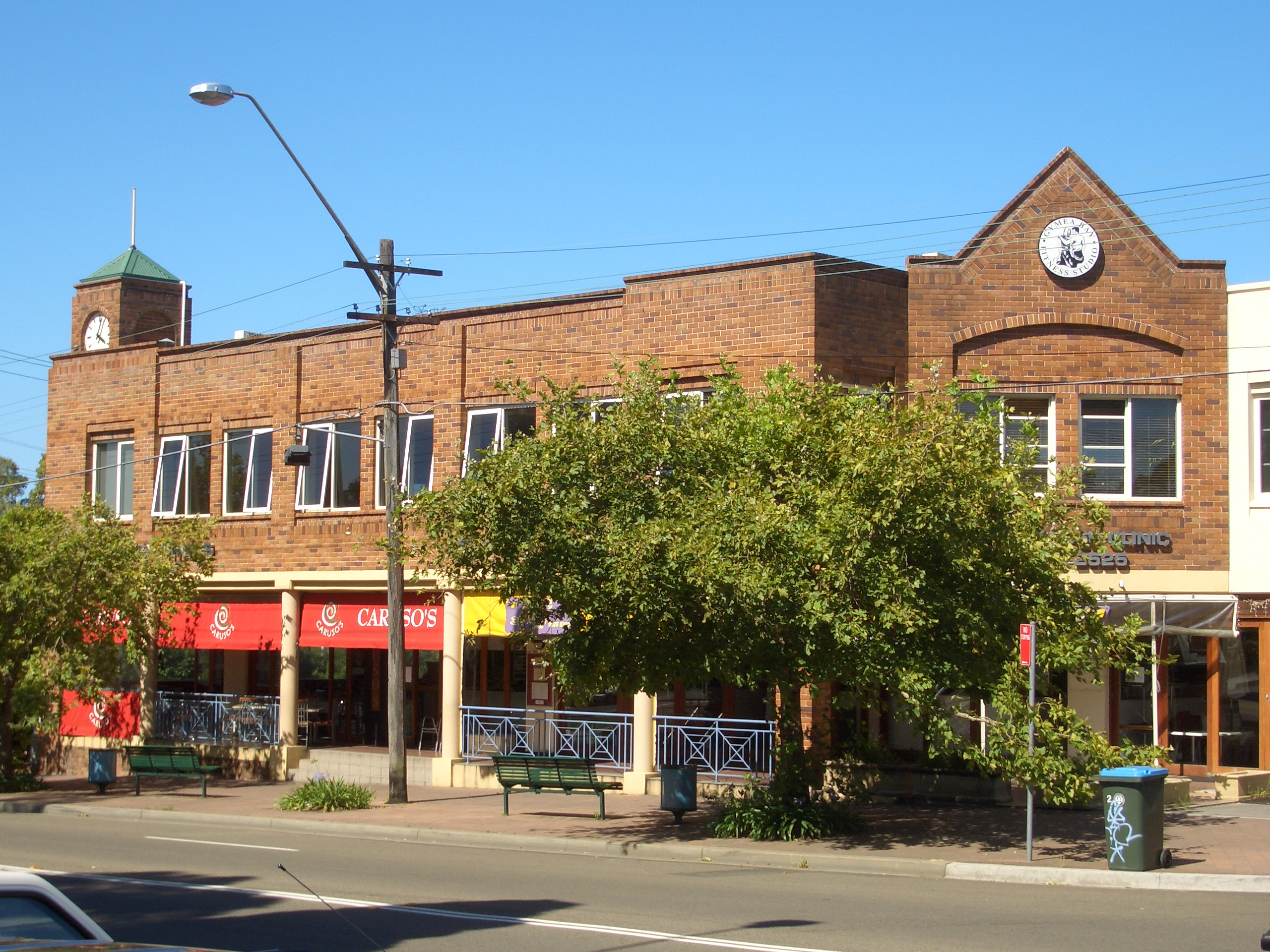
- Gymea Bay Road, Gymea

- Interactive map of Gymea
- Coordinates: 34°02′00″S 151°05′08″E
- Country: Australia
- State: New South Wales
- City: Sydney
- LGA: Sutherland Shire
- Location: 26 km (16 mi) south of Sydney CBD
- Established: 1939

Government
  - State electorates: Miranda; Cronulla
  - Federal division: Cook

Area
  - Total: 2.3 km^{2} (0.89 sq mi)
- Elevation: 72 m (236 ft)

Population
  - Total: 8,219 (2021 census)
  - Density: 2,857/km^{2} (7,400/sq mi)
- Postcode: 2227
Suburbs around Gymea
Sutherland	Kareela	Sylvania
Kirrawee	Gymea	Miranda
Grays Point	Gymea Bay	Yowie Bay

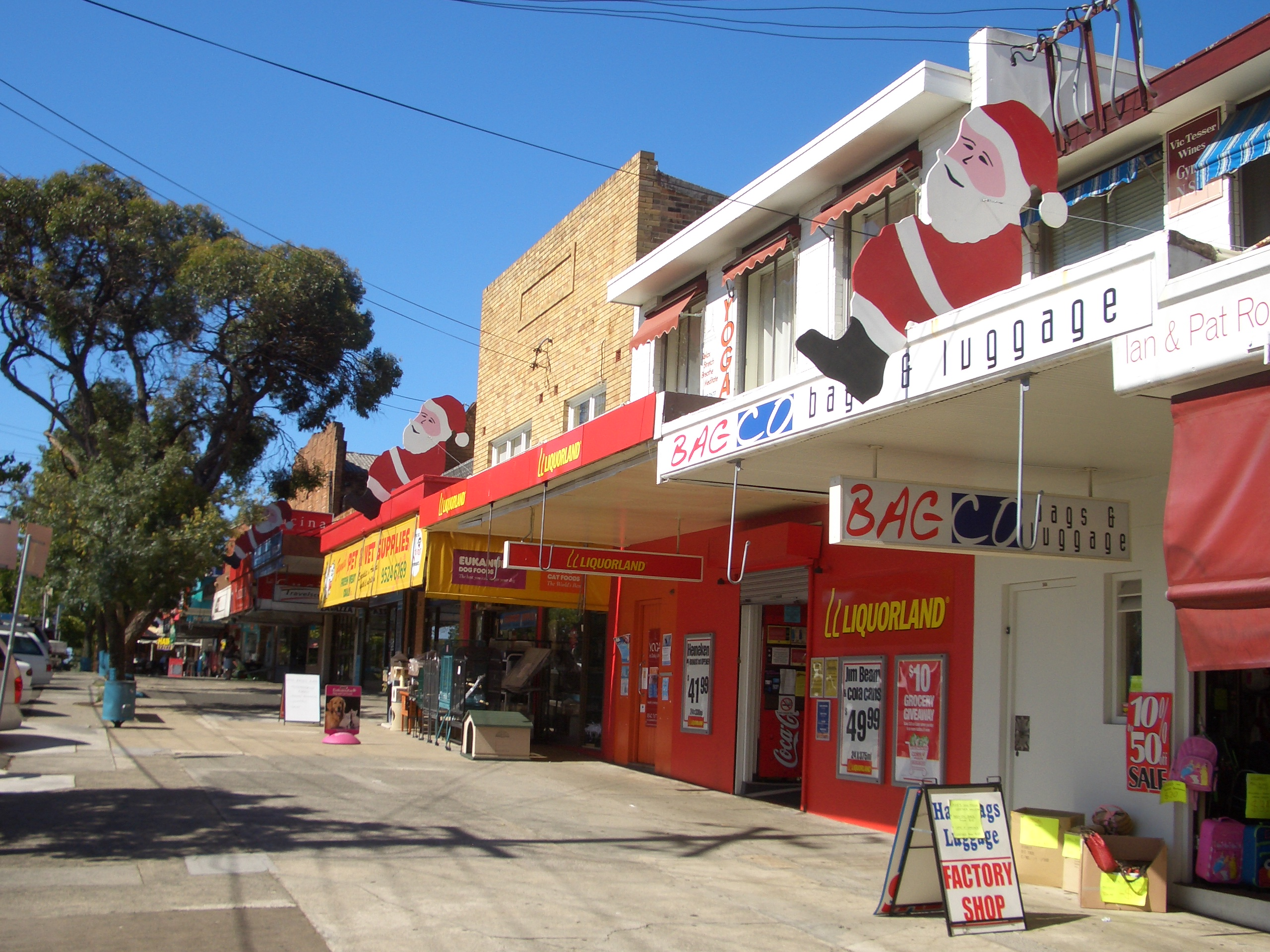
Gymea shops awnings at Christmas

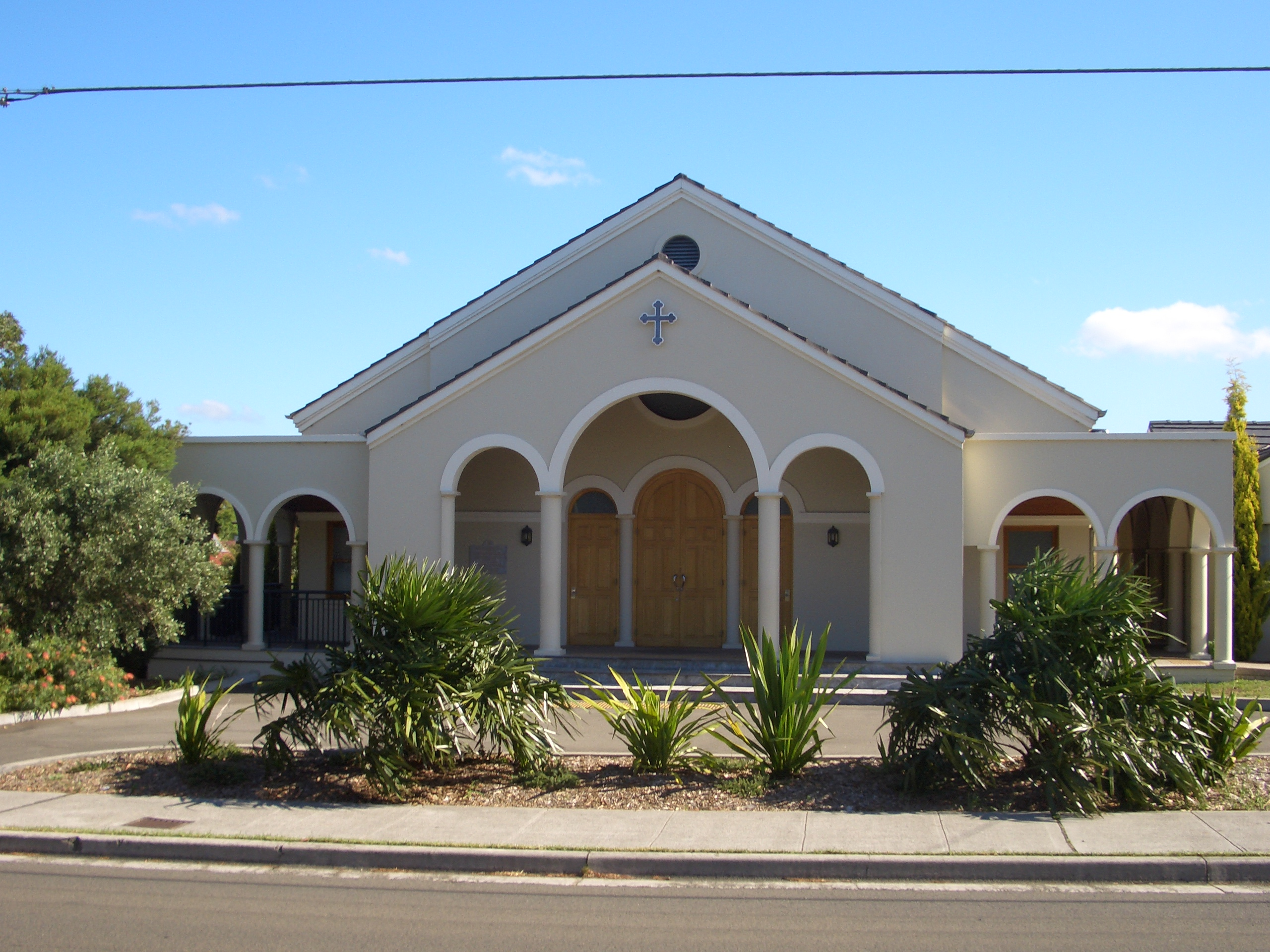
St Stylianos Greek Orthodox Church, The Kingsway

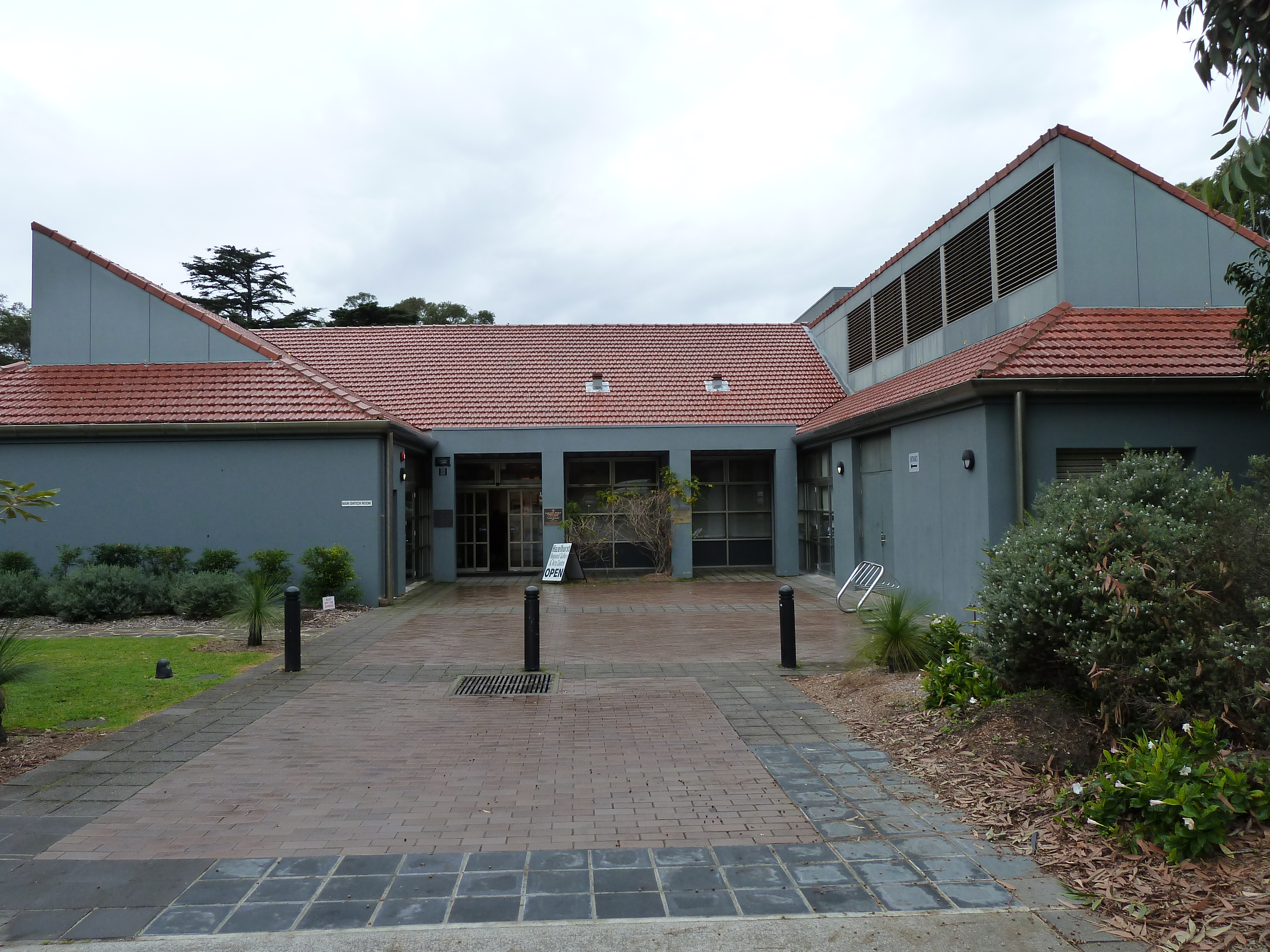
Hazelhurst Gallery

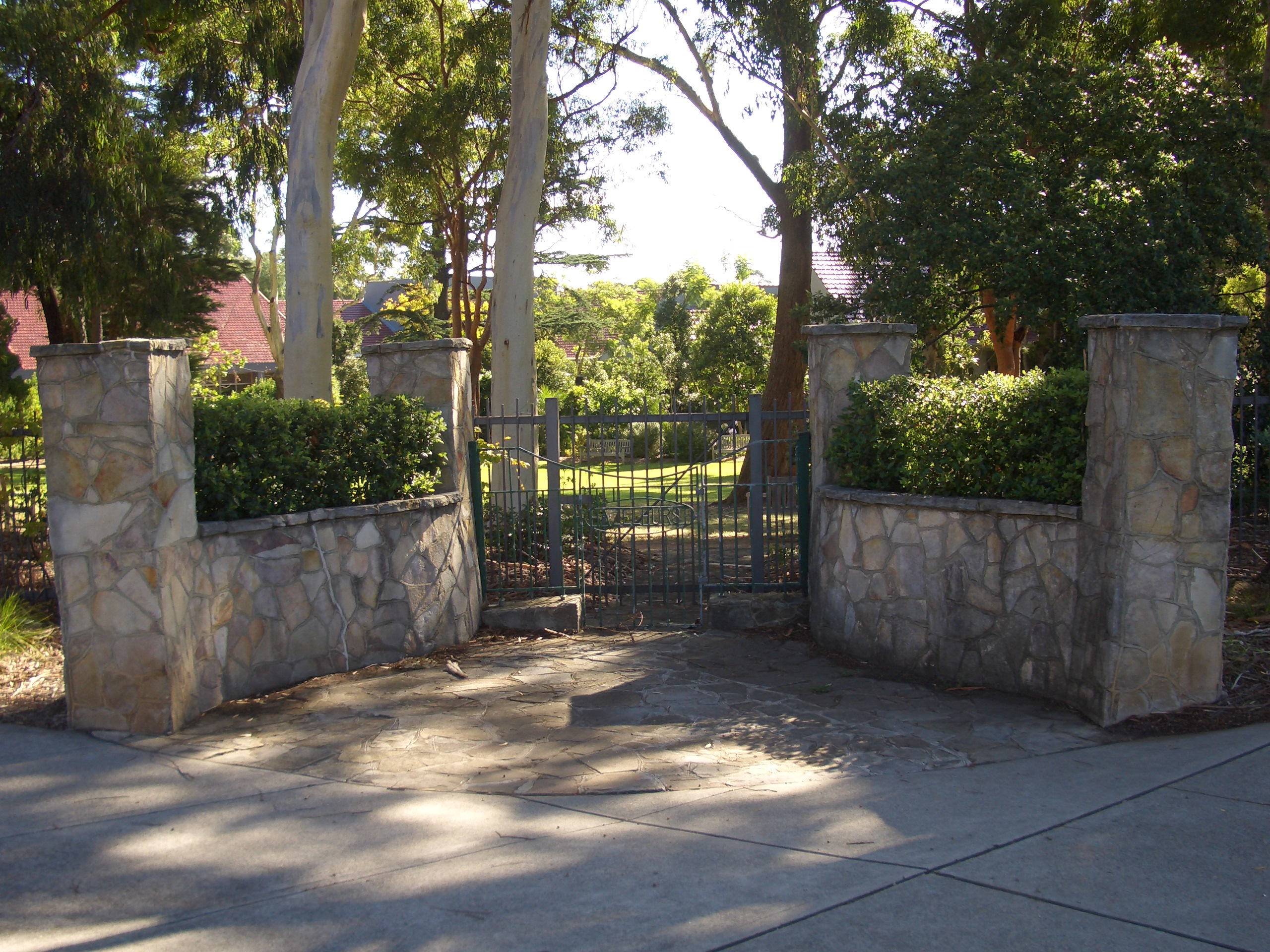
Hazelhurst Gallery gates

Gymea /ˌɡaɪ mi ə/ is a suburb in southern Sydney, Australia. Gymea is 26 kilometres (16 mi) south of the Sydney central business district in the local government area of the Sutherland Shire. The postcode is 2227, which it shares with adjacent suburb Gymea Bay.

== History ==
The Gymea Lily, Doryanthes excelsa is a 6m tall perennial that is prevalent in the area. It was named by the local Dharawal people as kai'mia in the Dharawal language. This word became the inspiration for the suburb's name, by government surveyor W.A.B. Geaves in 1855. The Gymea Lily has been adopted as a symbol of the area and features on the crest of many local organisations. Development in the area has eradicated most of the lilies but many can still be found, a few kilometres south, in the Royal National Park.

By the 1920s steam trams operated between Cronulla and Sutherland, via Gymea. The railway station on the line to Cronulla opened in 1939.

Gymea experienced substantial development after World War II. The influx of migrants, particularly from Europe and the baby boom, contributed to the demand for housing and infrastructure. The Australian government's push for suburbanisation and increasing accessibility of automobiles led to Gymea becoming an attractive place for families looking for more affordable housing outside of the city area. The 1950s and 1960s saw Gymea's conversion from a rural area to a bustling residential community. As more homes were built, local amenities such as schools, shopping centres and recreational facilities also began to be established. Gymea's proximity to beaches, parks and the Royal National Park made it a popular location for residents seeking a suburban lifestyle with access to nature. Its development of infrastructure, such as improved roads, transport links and the establishment of commercial areas, helped solidify its place as a key suburb in the Sutherland Shire. Gymea's population grew, becoming more connected to the greater Sydney area.

In the 1970s, Gymea continued to attract new families and retirees, becoming a thriving suburb. The post-war period was essential in shaping Gymea into a community, moving away from its rural roots toward a modern, residential suburb known for its mix of natural beauty and urban convenience.

== Population ==
In the 2021 census there were 8219 people in Gymea. 76.1% of people were born in Australia. The next most common countries of birth were England 4.0%, China 1.5%, New Zealand 1.5%, Philippines 1.0% and South Africa 0.6%. 82.3% of people spoke only English at home. Other languages spoken at home included Mandarin 1.7%, Greek 1.4% and Cantonese 1.3%. The most common responses for religion in were No Religion 35.7%, Catholic 27.2%, Anglican 16.0% and Eastern Orthodox 3.6%.

== Commercial area ==
Gymea is primarily a low-density residential suburb. Located close to Gymea railway station, the suburb's shopping strip is known as Gymea Shopping Village. Over the last decade it has become a popular shopping and 'café culture' district with many cafés, restaurants, boutiques and gourmet food shops opened along Gymea Bay Road. The Gymea Hotel is also located on Gymea Bay Road. It was opened in 1959 and was originally called the Gymea Rex Hotel.

== Transport ==
Gymea railway station is on the Cronulla branch of the Illawarra railway line and the Eastern Suburbs and Illawarra Line (T4), part of the Sydney Trains network, which provides regular rail services to the city. Gymea railway station is on Gymea Bay Road, in the middle of the main shopping area. Adjacent stations are Kirrawee and Miranda. Private buses, principally operated by U-Go Mobility also service the local area and provide school student transport.

== Education ==
The suburb has one public primary school, Gymea North Public School; a Catholic primary school, St Catherine Labouré Primary; a secondary school, Gymea Technology High School; and the Sydney Montessori School for pre-primary, primary and secondary students. Many children in Gymea attend schools in Gymea Bay, especially Gymea Bay Public School(the largest primary school in the Sutherland Shire), and Kirrawee. Gymea is also home to a campus of the Sydney Institute of TAFE.

== Churches ==
- St Paul's and St Barnabas Anglican Church
- St Catherine Labouré Catholic Church
- St Stylianos Greek Orthodox Church (officially known as St Stylianos, Saints Peter and Paul, St Gregory of Palamas)

== Culture ==
=== Art ===
Gymea is home to the Hazelhurst Regional Gallery and Arts Centre, which features art galleries, art studios, a theatrette, gardens, meeting rooms, gallery shop and café. A number of special events are held at the gallery throughout the year.

=== Sport ===
Like many suburbs in the Sutherland Shire, Gymea maintains an active culture of youth sport and has well-established cricket, rugby league, swimming (Gymea Bay Amateur Swimming Club), football (Gymea United FC, which is currently the largest club in the Oceania region), and netball clubs.

=== Pop culture ===
Australian writer Scot McPhie named his podcast and collection of poetry published in 1999 'Gymea', after living near the suburb in the 1990s. 2SSR broadcasts from Gymea TAFE.

=== Events ===
- The Gymea Village Fair is held every year in the last Sunday in October. The streets are closed for stalls, arts and crafts, rides and music.

=== Plant Nursery ===
The Sutherland Shire Council's Plant Nursery, with local plants propagated by Bushcare volunteers, is in Gymea. Plants are available for revegetation and landscaping.
