= Miranda, New South Wales =

Miranda
- Suburb
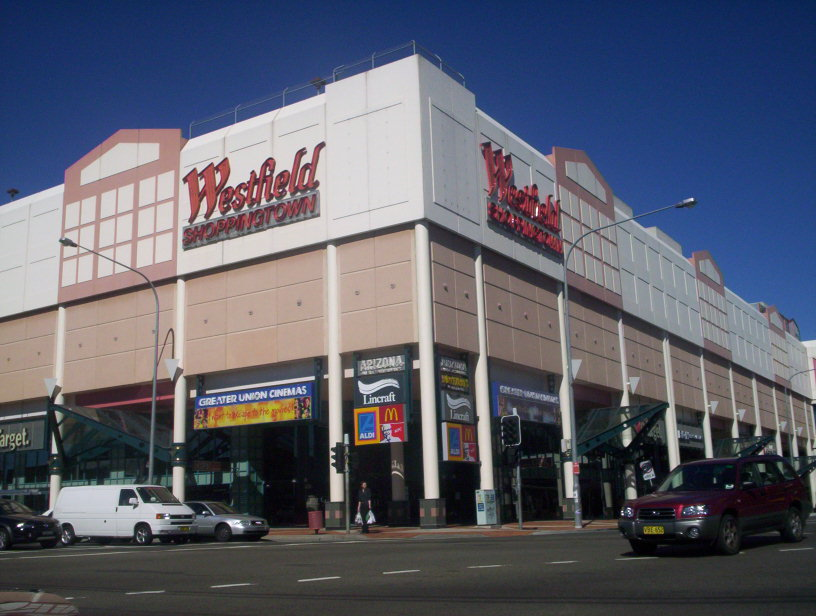
- Westfield shopping centre prior to renovations, Miranda

- Interactive map of Miranda
- Country: Australia
- State: New South Wales
- City: Sydney
- LGA: Sutherland Shire
- Location: 24 km (15 mi) south of Sydney CBD

Government
  - State electorates: Miranda; Cronulla
  - Federal division: Cook
- Elevation: 46 m (151 ft)

Population
  - Total: 17,942 (2021 census)
- Postcode: 2228
Suburbs around Miranda
Sylvania	Sylvania	Sylvania Waters
Gymea	Miranda	Caringbah
Gymea Bay	Yowie Bay	Caringbah

Miranda (/mɪˈrændə/) is a suburb in southern Sydney, in the state of New South Wales, Australia. The suburb is known as a commercial centre for the southern suburbs. Miranda is 24 kilometres south of the Sydney central business district, in the Sutherland Shire.

== History ==
Thomas Holt (1811–88) owned the land that stretched from Sutherland to Cronulla. James Murphy, the manager of the Holt estate named the area after Miranda, a character in the William Shakespeare play The Tempest. In a 1921 letter, James Murphy said "the name Miranda was given to the locality by me as manager of the Holt Sutherland Company which I formed in 1881. I thought it a soft, euphonious, musical and appropriate name for a beautiful place." It is believed that the character in the play was named after Miranda de Ebro, a town in Spain.

In 1918, the Miranda War Memorial was built in the grounds of the then Miranda Public School (now part of Miranda Westfield).

By the 1920s, steam trams operated between Cronulla and Sutherland, via Miranda. The trip from Miranda to Sutherland took fifteen minutes and cost three pence (2.5 cents). In 1923 there were five shops in Miranda, including a post office and butcher, at the intersection of the main road from Sutherland and Port Hacking Road. Settlements of returned soldiers from World War I were well established in Miranda at this time and the area was considered to be one of the best fruit-growing and poultry farming areas.

In 1955, Miranda Library opened.

In 1968, the war memorial moved to the cul-de-sac at the end of Central Road.

== Commercial areas ==
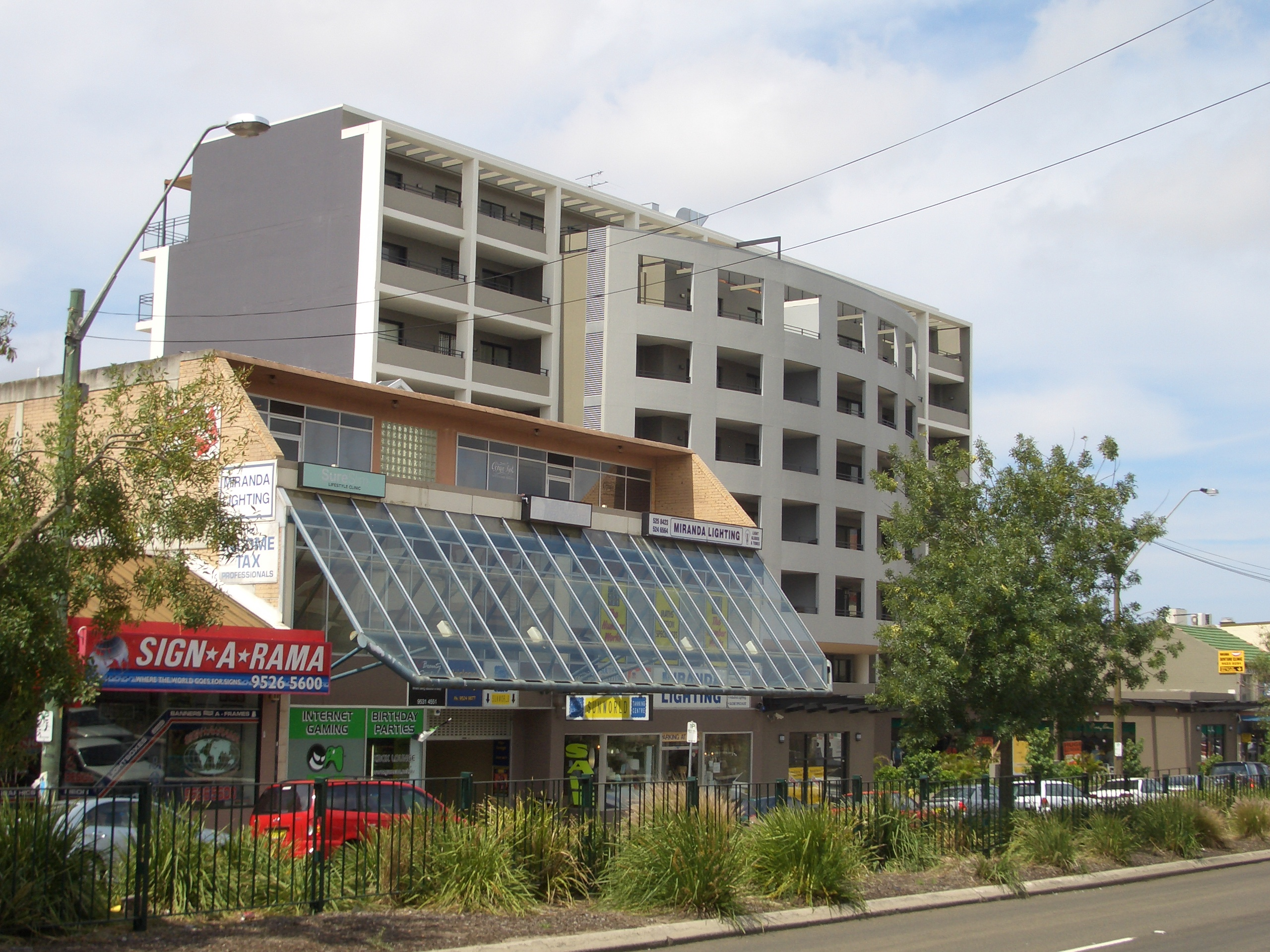
The Kingsway

Miranda is the main retail and commercial centre of the Sutherland Shire with shops located on either side of the railway line.

Westfield Miranda (previously known as Miranda Fair) is a large shopping centre in the middle of the suburb, adjacent to the Miranda railway station.

There are also two smaller shopping centres nearby, Lederer Shopping Centre Miranda (previously known as Parkside Plaza) and The Kiora Centre. Miranda also has a shopping strip, running along Kingsway and Kiora Road. Numerous commercial developments are also located on these roads and surrounding streets.

Miranda also has a light industrial area located in the north part of the centre and is located on Port Hacking and Box Roads.

The Miranda Hotel is also located on Kingsway and was formerly the Miranda Rex. It was originally designed in the 1950s by Lipson & Kadd who also designed the Padstow Hotel.

== Transport ==
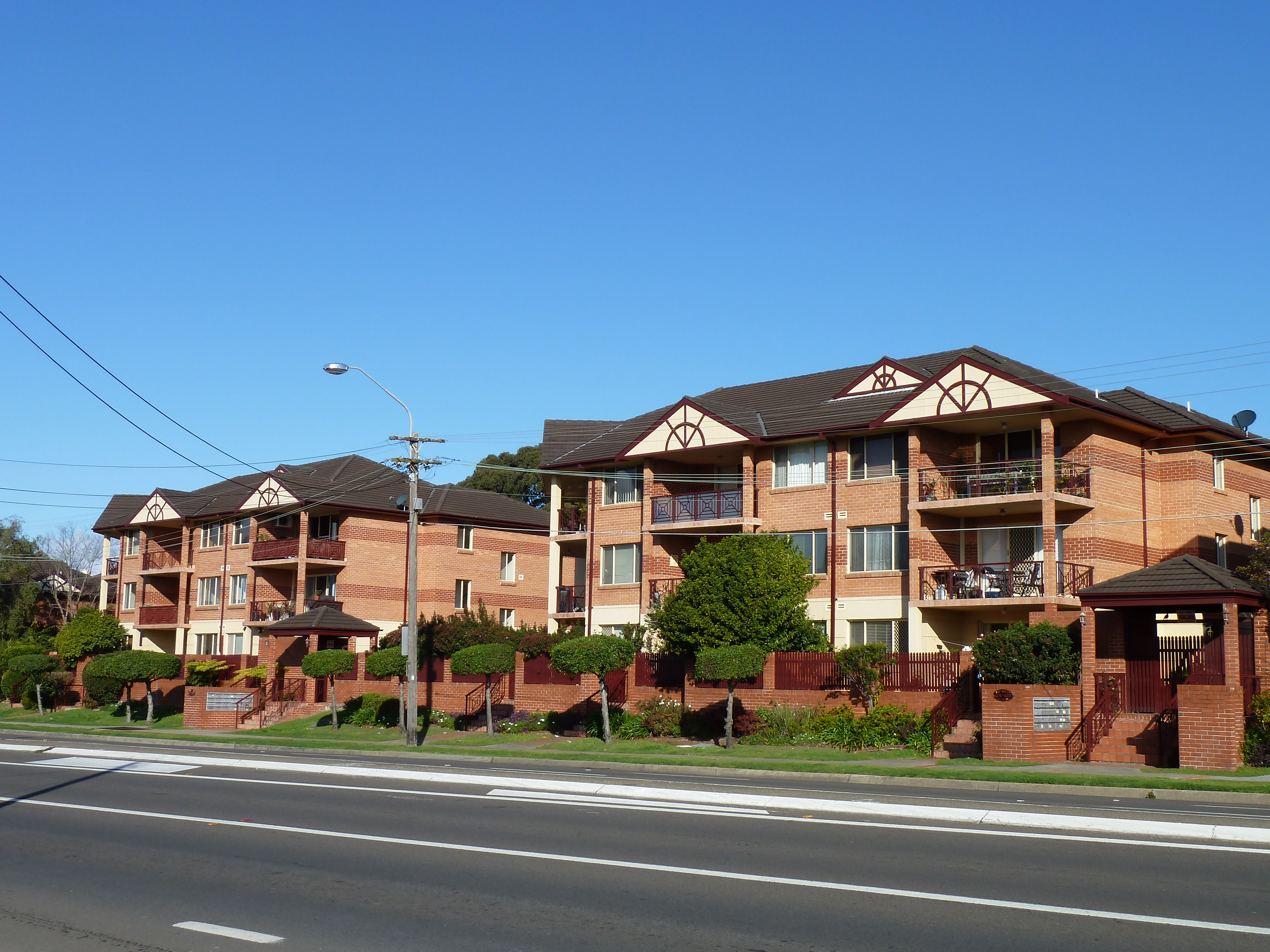
Apartments, Kingsway

- Kingsway, Port Hacking Road, The Boulevarde and Kiora Road are the main roads through Miranda. Until 2002 a Miranda landmark was called "the number one black spot in the State for minor accidents," the five-ways roundabout which intersected The Boulevard, Kiora Road and Port Hacking Road. An AUD$8m project was completed from 25 February 2002 – 20 November 2002 to remove the roundabout and implement a series of traffic lights at the intersection. Collisions at the intersection fell from 222 in 2002 to 13 in 2003.
- Miranda railway station is on the Cronulla branch of the Illawarra railway line on the Sydney Trains network. The railway station gives quick access to Cronulla Beach by train and also to Sydney Airport and the Sydney CBD.
- Maianbar Bundeena Bus Service, Transit Systems and U-Go Mobility provide bus services to Miranda. For full route details see Miranda station.

== Population ==
According to the 2021 census of Population, there were 17,942 residents in Miranda. 67.5% of people were born in Australia. The next most common countries of birth were England 3.7%, China 3.1%, New Zealand 2.1%, Philippines 1.4% and India 1.0%. 72.0% of people spoke only English at home. Other languages spoken at home included Mandarin 3.6%, Greek 2.3%, Cantonese 1.9%, Spanish 1.8% and Arabic 1.2%. The most common responses for religion were No Religion 32.9%, Catholic 26.5% and Anglican 13.7%.

== Sport ==
Miranda is home to several sports teams, including:

- Miranda Magpies FC (Association Football)
- Miranda Magpies Cricket Club (Cricket)
- Miranda Magpies Netball Club (Netball)
- Miranda Magpies AFC (Australian Rules Football)
- Miranda Magpies Football Club (Rugby League)

== Gallery ==
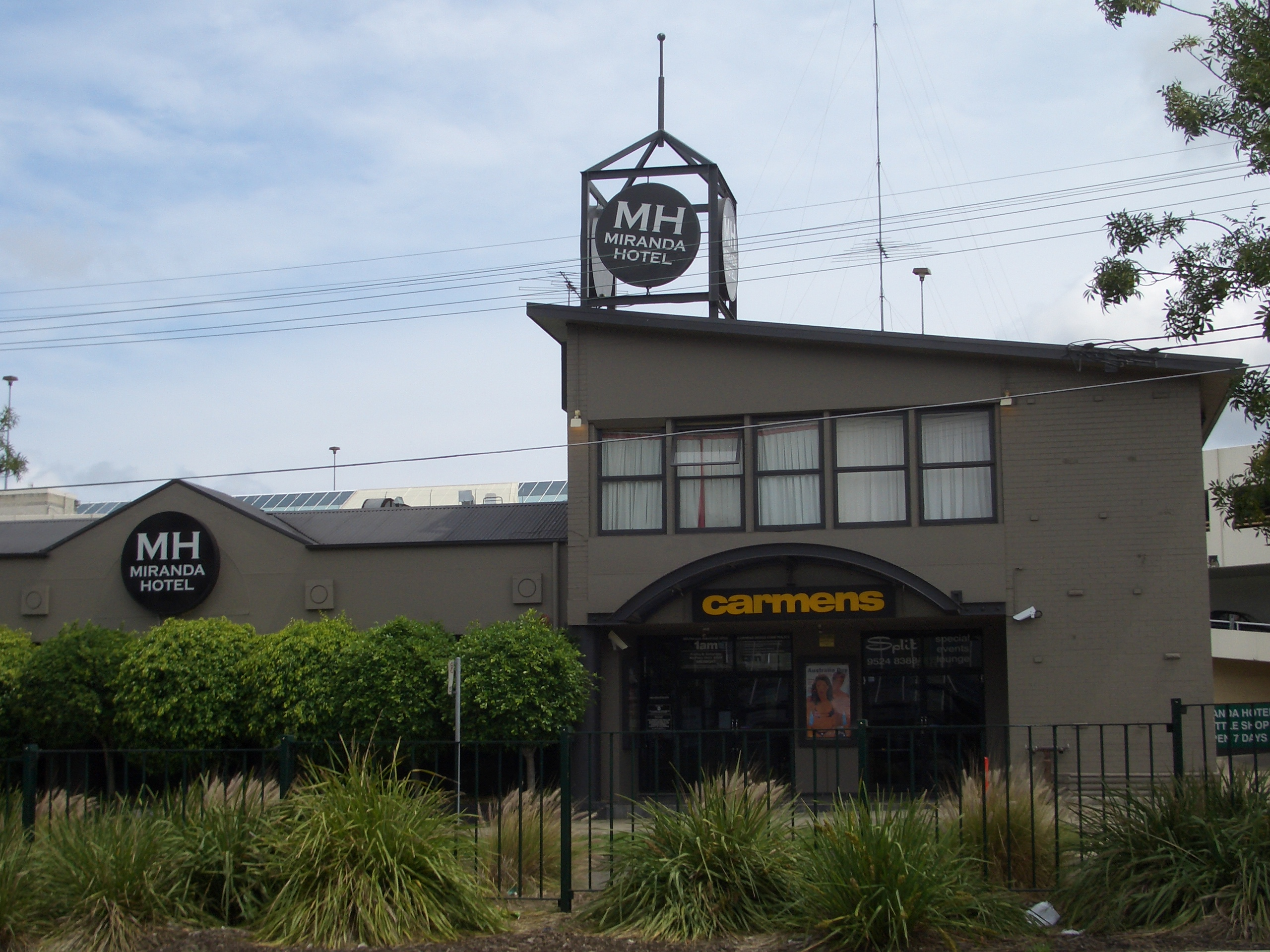
Miranda Hotel

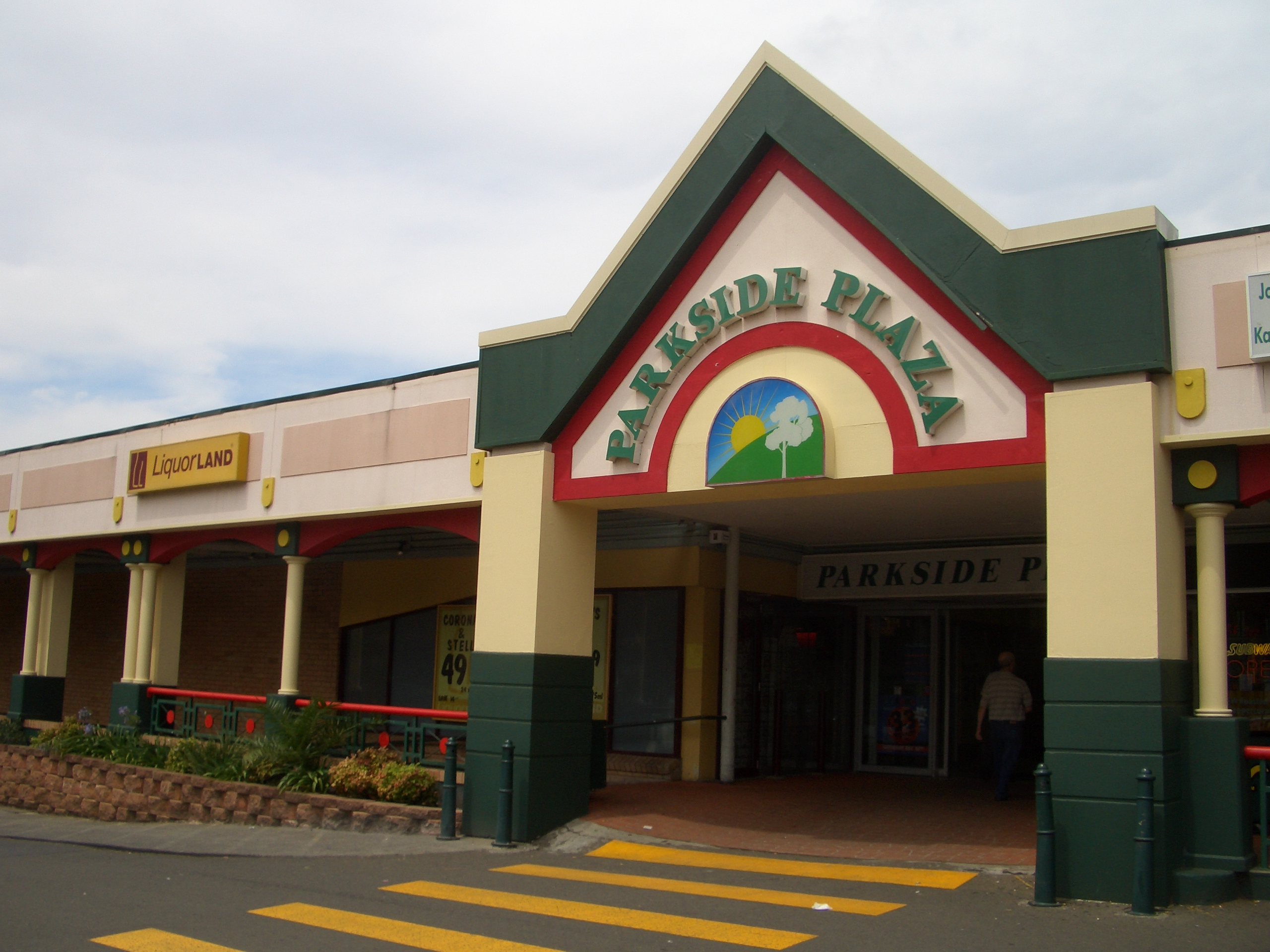
Parkside Plaza

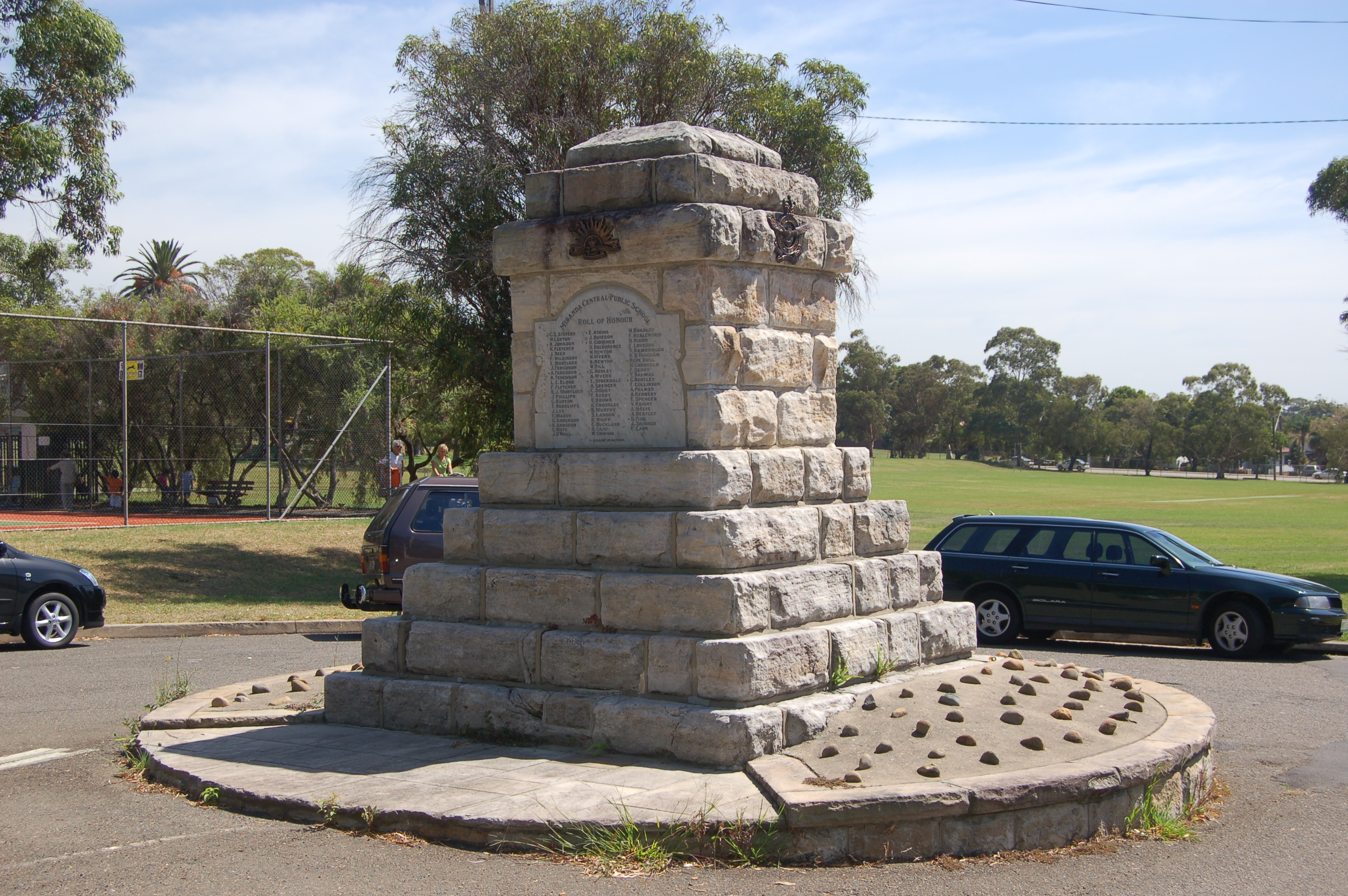
Miranda War Memorial, Seymour Shaw Park, Miranda, circa 2006

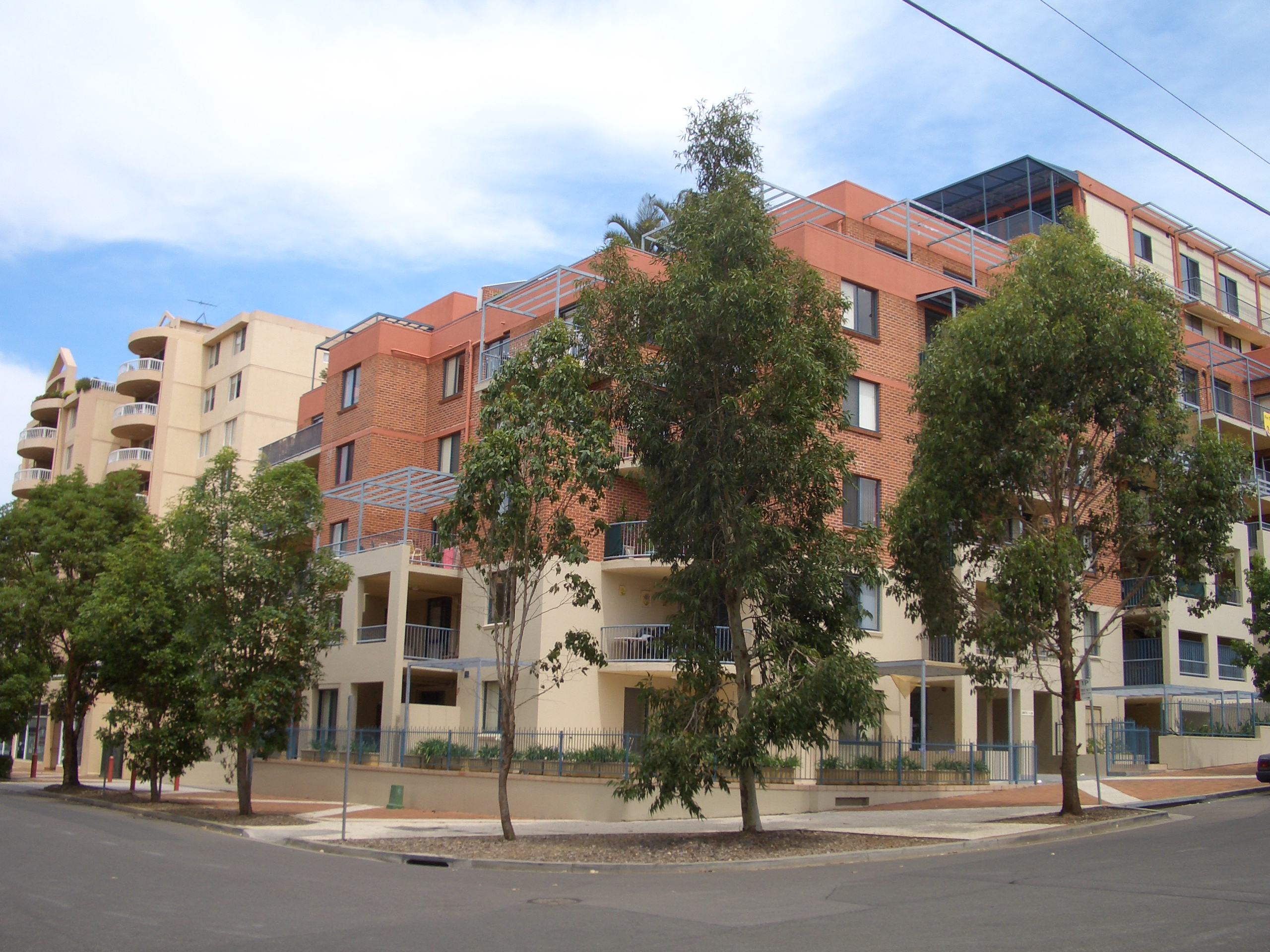
Central Road, Miranda
