= Gymea Bay, New South Wales =

Gymea Bay
- Suburb
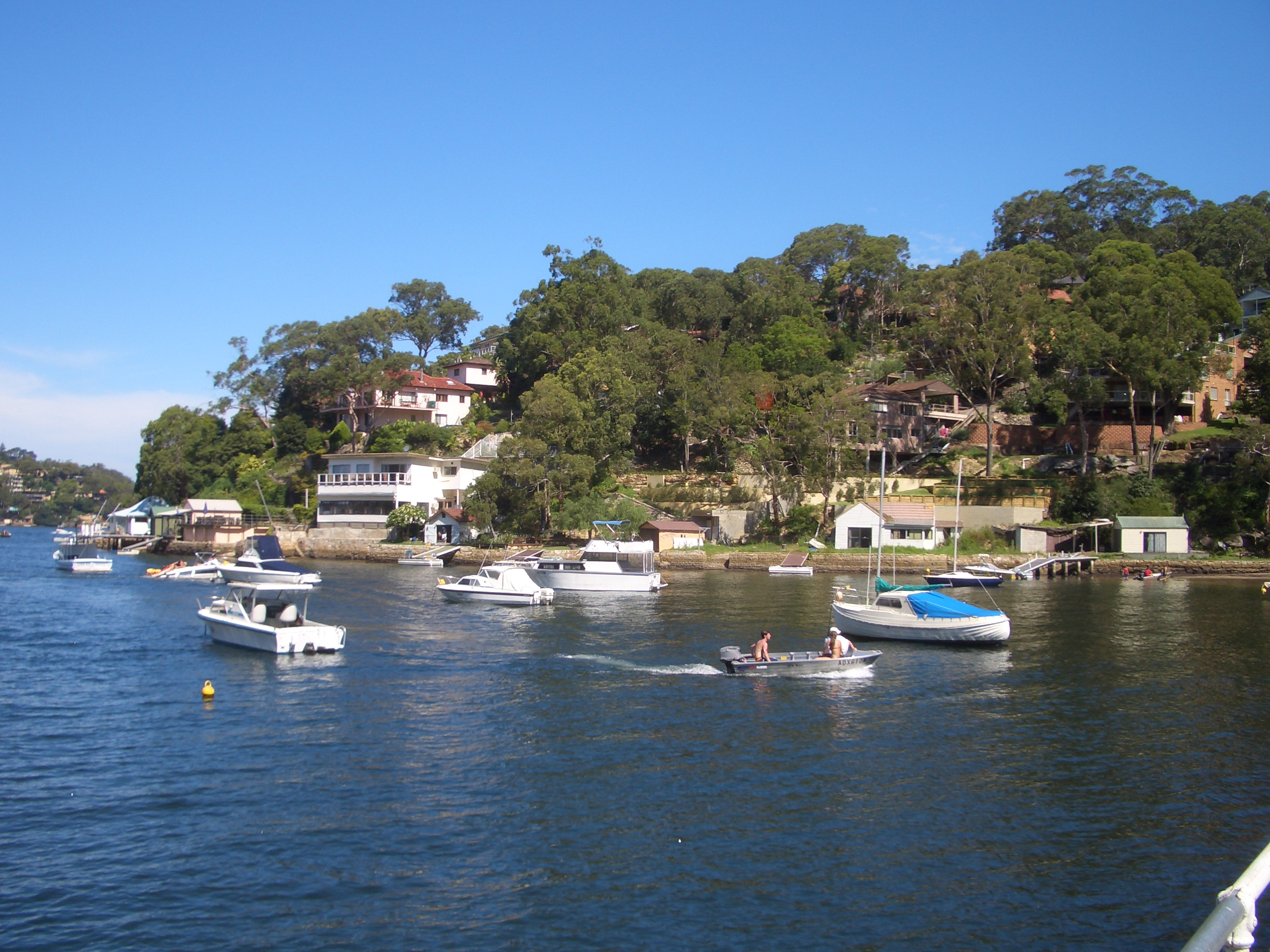
- Gymea Bay

- Interactive map of Gymea Bay
- Coordinates: 34°2′59″S 151°5′11″E
- Country: Australia
- State: New South Wales
- City: Sydney
- LGA: Sutherland Shire
- Location: 27 km (17 mi) south of Sydney CBD

Government
  - State electorate: Cronulla
  - Federal division: Cook
- Elevation: 66 m (217 ft)

Population
  - Total: 6,983 (2021 census)
- Postcode: 2227
Suburbs around Gymea Bay
Kirrawee	Gymea	Miranda
Kirrawee	Gymea Bay	Yowie Bay
Grays Point	Royal National Park	Yowie Bay

The locality and suburb of Gymea Bay are located in southern Sydney, in the state of New South Wales, Australia. Gymea Bay is 27 kilometres (17 mi) south of the Sydney central business district, in the local government area of the Sutherland Shire. Its postcode is 2227, which it shares with the adjacent suburb of Gymea. The Gymea Bay locality takes its name from the adjoining Gymea Bay, a small bay on the north side of the Port Hacking estuary.

The locality includes only the single peninsula between Gymea Bay and the North West Arm of the Port Hacking River, bounded by Coonong Creek on the north and, on the west, by an unnamed creek flowing south of Gymea Bay Road between Barraran Street and Coonong Road. Gymea Bay became a locality within the suburb of Gymea. Early street directories show the locality of Gymea Bay as part of the suburb of Gymea.

In 2008, the NSW Geographical Names Board proposed an enlarged area for the suburb of Gymea Bay, incorporating parts of Gymea north of Coonong Creek, and parts of Miranda. The suggested boundaries were defined by Forest Road on the northeast, Avenel Road on the north, Dents Creek on the west, and the waters of North West Arm and Gymea Bay to the south.

The locality was characterised by large amounts of verdant bushland. However, since the 1980s, increased subdivision with smaller lots, larger houses and increased motor vehicle ownership has decreased the number of large trees. Despite Tree Preservation Orders and Council Greenweb and Greenweb Support planning zones, much of the treescape has been lost. Since the 1990s, invasions of feral deer from the Royal National Park have begun to negatively affect shrub and ground cover and regrowth of trees.

== Origin of name ==
"Gymea" was the local Eora people's name for the Gymea Lily Doryanthes excelsa, a tall (up to 6m) perennial plant. It is known as kai'mia in the Dharawal language. In 1855, the NSW government surveyor W.A.B. Greaves named the area Gymea after the plants which were prevalent in the area. The Gymea Lily has been adopted as a symbol of the area and features on the crest of many local organisations. Local development has eradicated most of these lilies, however, they can still be found around the Port Hacking River in the Royal National Park.

== History ==
The local Dharawal people hunted, fished and gathered food and materials over the area but there appears to be no sites of settlement with more suitable sites nearby. There are Aboriginal rock markings and middens at the headlands of the North West Arm of Port Hacking.

The settlement at Gymea Bay grew around the transport access to the Port Hacking River. With the opening of a railway line from Sydney to Sutherland in 1885, carts and coaches could reach Gymea Bay as the closest point on the Port Hacking River by relatively easy grades. Gymea Bay Road originally led all the way to the shore of Gymea Bay where a wharf and boat shed developed and mail and supplies were taken by boat to houses along the Port Hacking River. With the operation of the Sutherland to Cronulla tramway from 1911 to 1931 and the Sutherland to Cronulla railway with Gymea railway station opening in 1939, Gymea Bay developed from a rural area into a recreation and holiday area with fishing shacks and holiday homes. By the 1920s, a coach depot was built on what is now the reserve and playground at the intersection of Gymea Bay Road and Sylvania Road South (now Casuarina Road). A general store was operated by Mr. & Mrs. Jarvis from 1921 and Post Office opened. Electricity arrived in 1926. Tank water gave way to reticulated water supply from the 1930s.

Church of England services were held at private homes from 1927 and a church hall, St. Barnabus Church, was built at 276a Gymea Bay Road and held its first service in March 1929. A progress association, now Gymea Bay Community Association, was formed and a community hall was built on Sylvania Road South (now 26 Greygum Place). Gymea Bay Public School opened in August 1935 with 65 students. Another general store, churches, a joinery factory, a playground, tennis courts at Sylvania Road South (now 5-7 Casuarina Road) and later a butcher's shop all developed at or near the intersection of Gymea Bay Road and Sylvania Road South.

Gymea Bay Baths were built and Gymea Bay Amateur Swimming Club developed as did a short lived sailing club and club boatshed on the shore opposite the baths. Kemp's Cosy Cabins and Caravan Park operated on the south of the peninsula with cabins and camping sites from Ellesmere Road to the North West Arm of the Port Hacking River where it had a large two-storey sandstone boatshed and function hall. Another tennis court was built at 250 Gymea Bay Road. A petrol service station opened at 237 Gymea Bay Road, opposite Vernon Avenue, and a much larger bus depot was built at 227 Gymea Bay Road.

In 1955 Gymea Bay Public School was moved to a new site further up Gymea Bay Road, beyond the boundary of Gymea Bay. Sutherland Shire Council moved the community hall from Sylvania Road (now 26 Greygum Place) near the intersection of Gymea Bay Road to the new reserve and oval, beyond the boundary of Gymea Bay. Gymea Bay Boy Scouts opened in 1957 on the old school site before moving to a new subdivision in June Place next to the oval. Private landline telephones were connected in the early 1960s. By the 1970s, several businesses in Gymea Bay closed or relocated. The old school site was vacant for decades and earmarked for sale for housing development before being developed as a park with playground.

Aerial photographs from 1930 and 1955 show the original Gymea Bay settlement.

== Population ==
In the 2021 census, there were 6,983 residents in Gymea Bay. The most common ancestries were English 43.2%, Australian 41.3%, Irish 13.3%, Scottish 11.9% and Italian 4.9%. 83.9% of people were born in Australia. The next most common country of birth was England at 4.2%. 90.8% of people spoke only English at home. The most common responses for religion were No Religion 36.5%, Catholic 26.7% and Anglican 19.8%. The median household weekly income of $3,047 was substantially higher than the national figure of $1,746.

=== Notable people ===
- Eora people: traditional custodians of the land
- Hon. Mark Speakman: local member for parliament

== Commercial area ==
The suburb of Gymea Bay is mostly residential, with a small group of shops located in Casuarina Road near the intersection of Gymea Bay Road. The suburb's needs are principally served by shops in neighbouring suburbs, especially Gymea and Miranda.

== Schools ==
Gymea Bay Public School is located on Gymea Bay Road. As of 2025, Gymea Bay Public School is the largest primary school in the Sutherland Shire with an enrolment of 752 students and 75 staff.

== Recreation ==
Gymea Bay is home to the heritage Gymea Bay Baths, at the shore of Gymea Bay Baths Reserve at the intersection of Gymea Bay Road and Ellesmere Road. Gymea Bay Amateur Swimming Club has been using the baths for over 40 years. The bay and Port Hacking estuary are used extensively for recreation and fishing.

== Coonong Creek Bushland Reserve ==
Coonong Creek Bushland Reserve in Gymea Bay is a remnant bushland area maintained by Sutherland Shire Council and volunteers. Its walking tracks link with the Old School Park and Gymea Bay Baths Reserve.

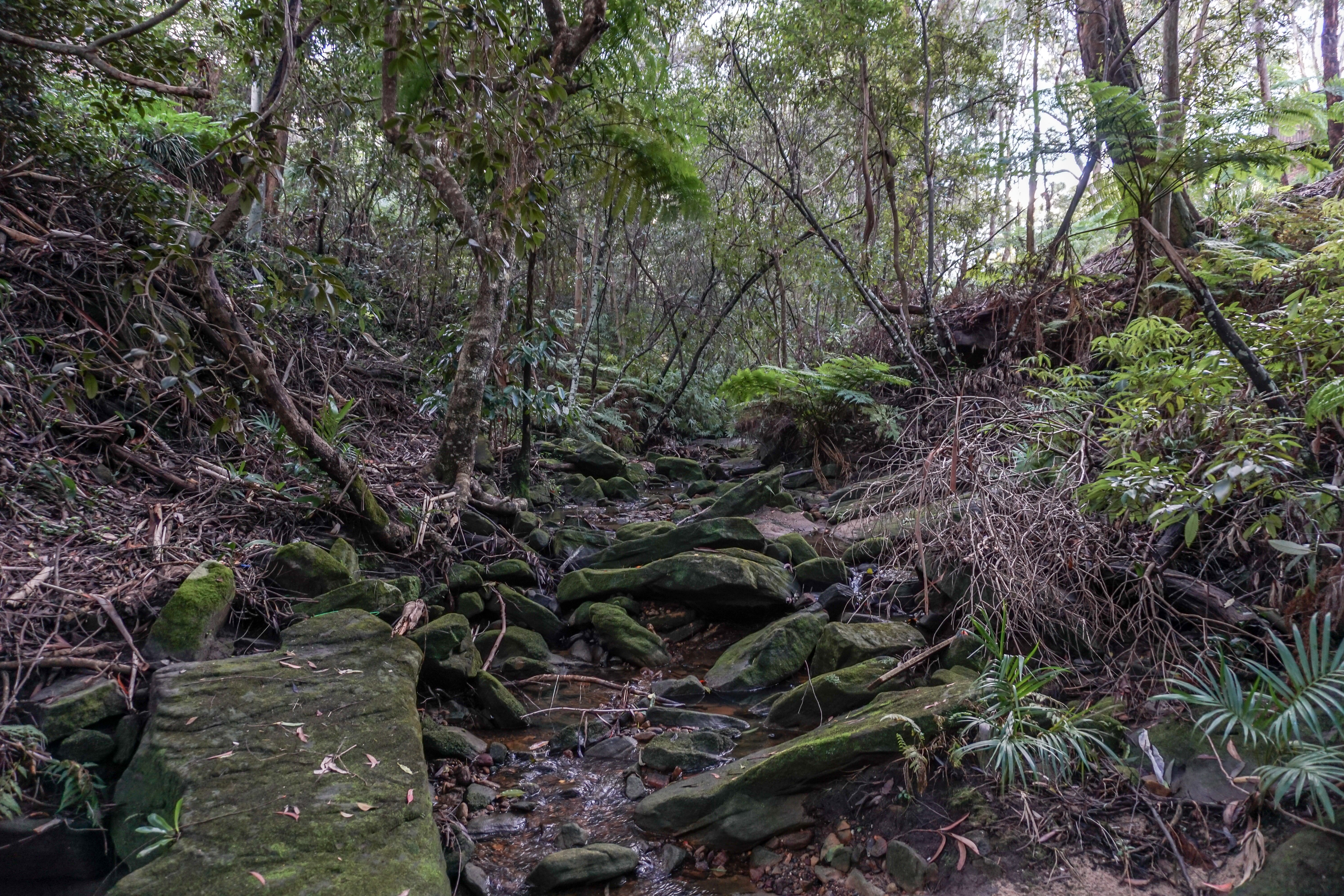
Coonong Creek Bushland Reserve in Gymea Bay, Sydney
