= Kirrawee =

- Suburb
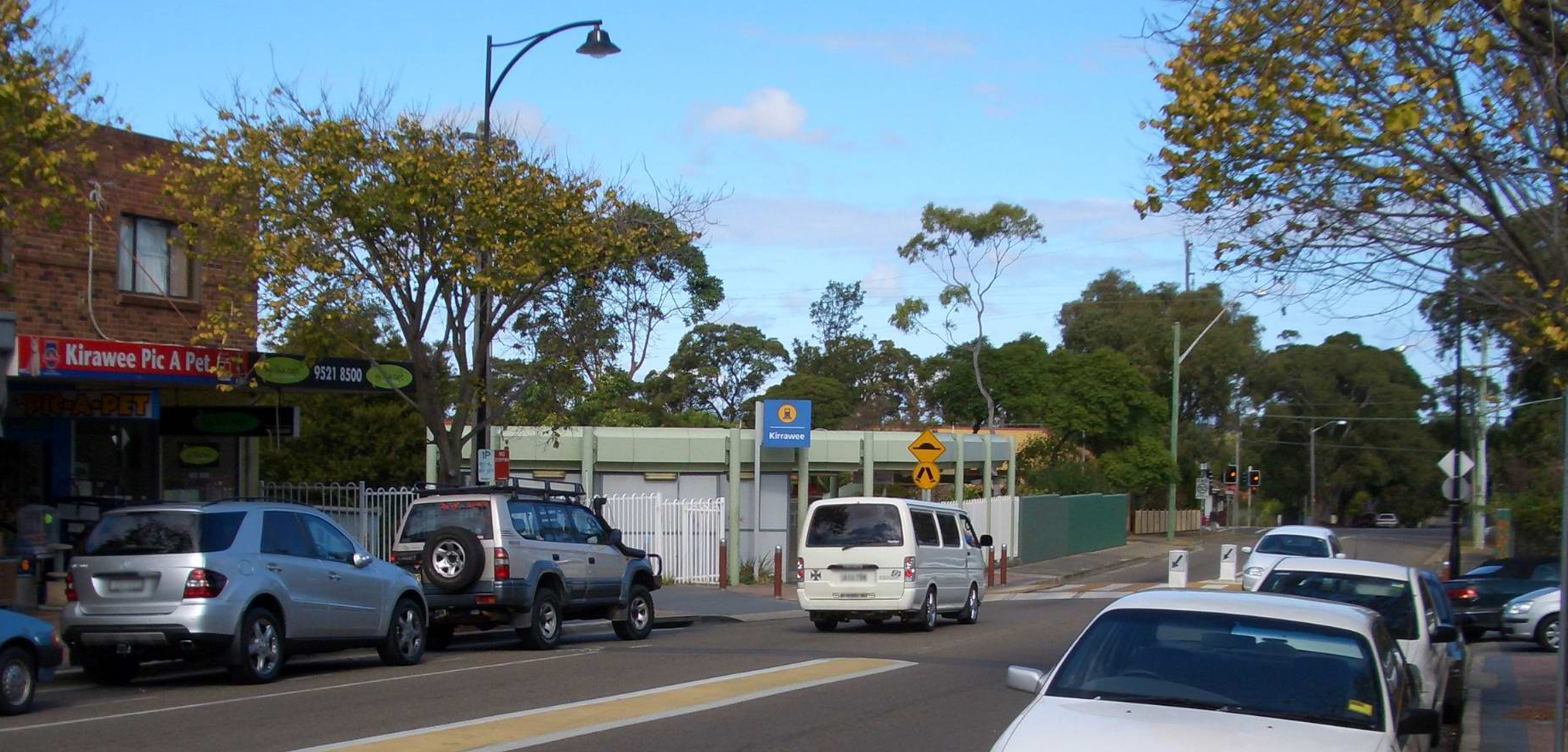
- Oak Road, Kirrawee

- Interactive map of Kirrawee
- Coordinates: 34°2′5″S 151°4′16″E
- Country: Australia
- State: New South Wales
- City: Sydney
- LGA: Sutherland Shire
- Location: 25 km (16 mi) south of Sydney CBD
- Established: 1939

Government
  - State electorates: Miranda; Cronulla; Heathcote
  - Federal division: Cook

Area
  - Total: 4.2 km^{2} (1.6 sq mi)
- Elevation: 102 m (335 ft)

Population
  - Total: 11,007 (2021 census)
  - Density: 2,621/km^{2} (6,790/sq mi)
- Postcode: 2232
Suburbs around Kirrawee
Jannali	Kareela	Sylvania
Sutherland	Kirrawee	Gymea
Royal National Park	Grays Point	Gymea Bay

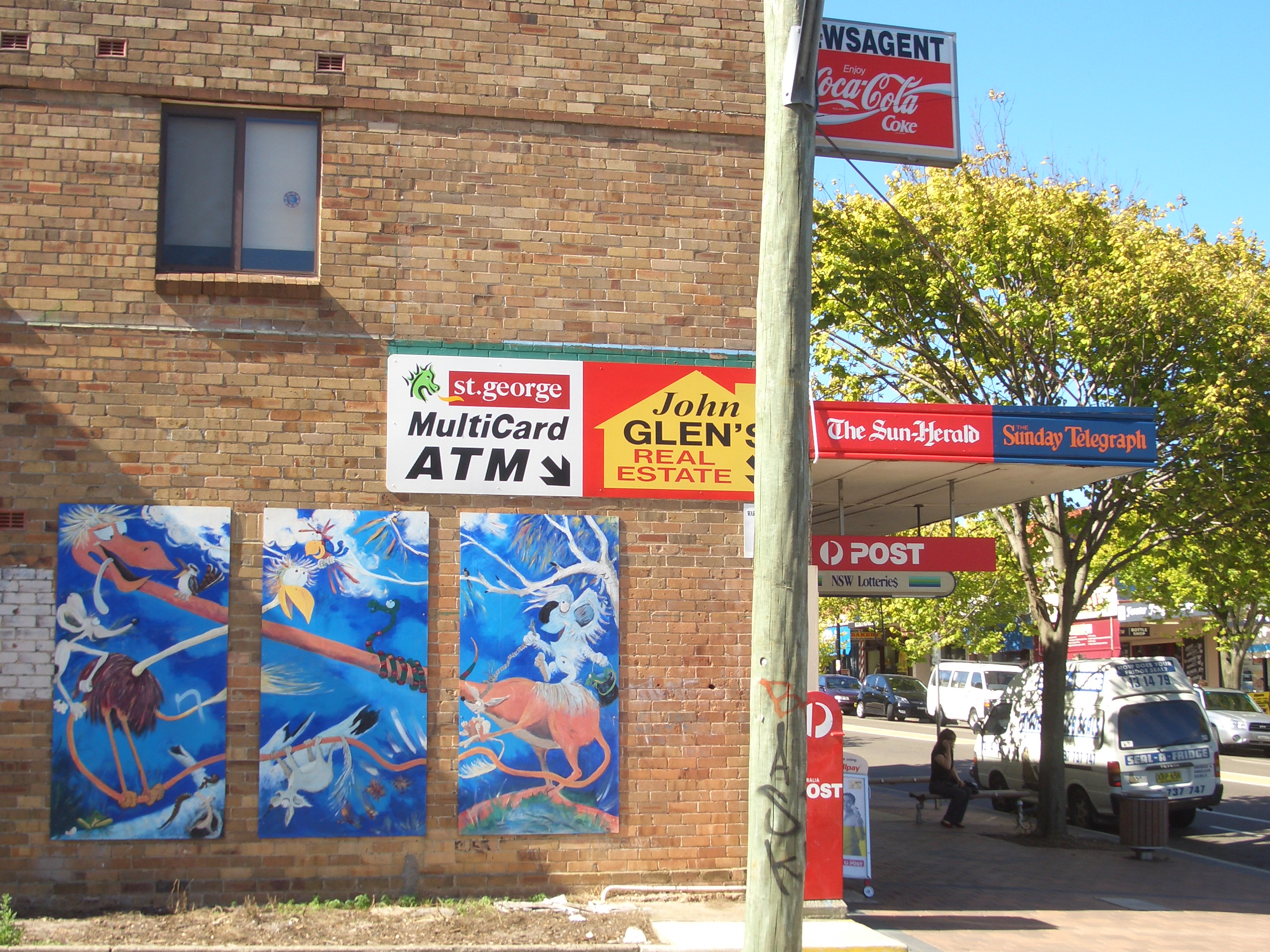
Oak Road, Kirrawee

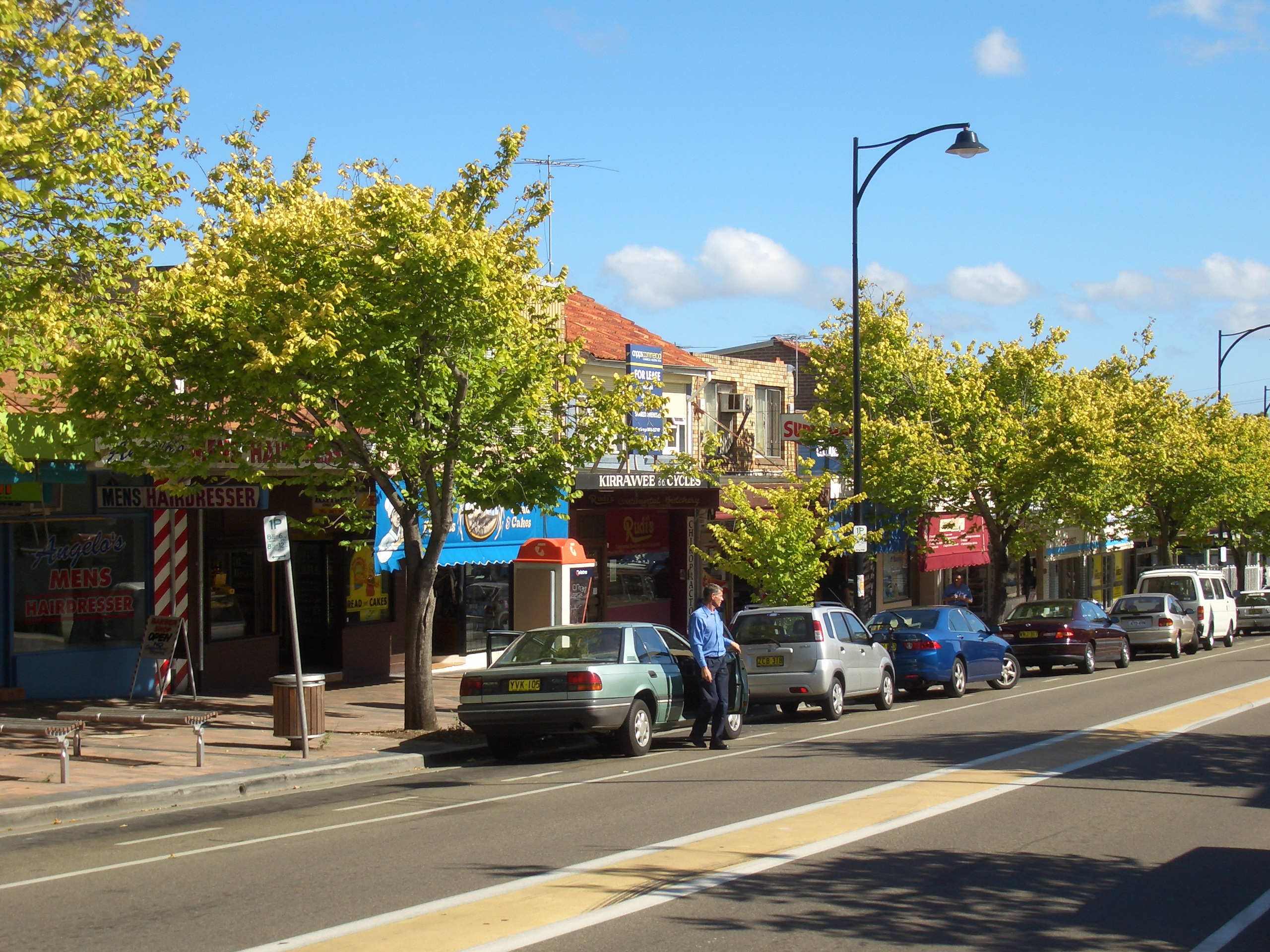
Oak Road, Kirrawee

Kirrawee is a suburb in southern Sydney, in the state of New South Wales, Australia. Kirrawee is located 25 kilometres south of the Sydney central business district in the Sutherland Shire. Kirrawee lies between Sutherland, to the west, and Gymea and Grays Point, to the east. Kirrawee's southern border is formed by the Royal National Park, while Kareela and Jannali form the northern border.

Kirrawee is split between commercial and residential areas. Approximately 50% of the area to the north of the train line is occupied by commercial and industrial properties, while almost all of the area south of the train line is residential. South Kirrawee, which extends from the train line in the north to the Royal National Park in the south, has many houses on quiet roads with beautiful bush outlooks. North Kirrawee is predominantly a commercial/industrial zone containing small to medium-sized factories housing local businesses. It is also home to a number of petrol stations, car dealerships and a fast food chain outlet. However, the most northerly and western sections of this part of Kirrawee are residential, with some parts also with bush outlooks.

== History ==
The Sutherland Shire Council website suggests two possible origins for the name Kirrawee. The first possibility is that it derives from an Aboriginal word meaning 'lengthy'; the second is that it derives from a Dharawal word, "gi(a)rrawee(i)" (alternative spelling "garrawi"), which means 'place of white cockatoos' or 'sulphur-crested cockatoos'. The current signage erected by the Council uses 'place of white cockatoos' as the accepted meaning for the suburb name. The name was adopted in 1939 with the opening of the Sutherland-Cronulla railway line. A postal receiving office in the locality was known as 'Bladesville'. It operated from the home of Mrs Louisa Blade, was opened in 1909 and closed in 1915 when a letter delivery service commenced from the post office at Sutherland.

Kirrawee is part of the southern Sydney region inhabited by the Dharawal people at least 8,500 years prior to European settlement. Before being subdivided as Kirrawee, the area was part of Thomas Holt's Sutherland Estate and was accessed from Sutherland train station. In 1911 a tramway was opened, giving access to the area. At around the same time, the brickworks opened. It was not until the 1950s that Kirrawee became heavily settled, with many families looking to resettle after World War II. In 1946, several blocks of land in Kirrawee went for several times their asking value - valued at £30, £60 and £64, they sold for £140, £195 and £160. As of 1949, the Department of Education had accepted a tender for a primary school to be built in Kirrawee. Some street names in Kirrawee commemorate colonial figures connected with the Rum Rebellion: Bligh Street and Putland Close were named after Governor William Bligh, and his daughter, Mary Putland, respectively; Johnston Avenue was named after George Bain Johnston, a First Fleet lieutenant who arrested Governor Bligh; Kemp Avenue was named after Anthony Fenn Kemp, a captain in charge of government stores who was also involved in Bligh's arrest. In February 1966 Kirrawee High School opened. In that same year, the Housing Commission built low-cost fibro homes in Kirrawee. In October 1968, bushfires went close to Kirrawee and residents prepared to evacuate, but the fire was brought under control.

There are three houses that are heritage-listed in Kirrawee, as well as the brick pit site.

== Commercial area ==
A geoshape of Kirrawee

Kirrawee has a small shopping village on Oak Road, adjacent to Kirrawee railway station. It consists of a number of food outlets, newsagent, law firm, accountant, dentist, real estate agents and bike shop, among others. The train station and shopping village are located in the geographical centre of the suburb and are serviced by a 150 space carpark. A number of painted murals located around the shopping village and train station are an interesting feature in the suburb.

Approximately 50% of the area to the north of the train line is occupied by commercial and industrial properties, while almost all of the area south of the train line is residential. North Kirrawee is predominantly a commercial/industrial zone containing small to medium-sized factories housing local businesses. It is also home to a number of petrol stations, car dealerships and a fast food chain outlet.

Sylvanvale, a disability services provider, is headquartered in Kirrawee.

Rudi's Butchery, a German artisan butcher, opened in Kirrawee in 1983. Closed on 27 August 2022

In the 1990s, shops specialising in hardware, furniture, bulky goods and electrical goods drew customers to the industrial area of Kirrawee. The Shark Island Brewery is located in the industrial area of Kirrawee, which opened in 2015.

There is also a small shopping area in Putland Close, behind Kirrawee High School. In 2012, an application to have a liquor store near Kirrawee High School was refused.

In 2016, McDonald's Kirrawee applied to redevelop its site to have a dual-lane drive-through.

A hotel, The Prince, opened diagonally opposite the Kirrawee brick pit in early 2017, aiming to target families as part of their clientele. The site previously had a service station and mechanical repair shop. The Prince was a finalist in the 2017 Australian Hotels Association's "Hotel of the Year City" award division.

On 14 November 2018, South Village Kirrawee opened its doors.

In 2019, resident pressure persuaded local Councillors to purchase a proposed 2000 square metre development site next to the local shopping area on the south-east corner of the railway bridge on Oak Rd, allocating the site to parkland to prevent a controversial proposed 50-room boarding house to go ahead on the site.

Following the council's decision, another development proposal was lodged for a large boarding house, this one proposed to accommodate up to 129 people in a five-story building adjoining the railway station car park.

== Sydney Turpentine Ironbark Forest ==
Kirrawee contains several important remnants of Sydney Turpentine Ironbark Forest (STIF), a critically endangered ecological community. STIF is distinctly different from the surrounding plant communities that grow on sandstone soils, as it typically grows on clay soils derived from Wianamatta Shale.

Kirrawee's small patches of STIF vegetation are representative of the original forest between Sutherland and Wooloware, before residential development. Although this type of forest remains, for the most part, only as heavily fragmented patches or even isolated trees surviving amongst suburban dwellings, small remnants yet survive and can be seen growing around Kirrawee - in protected sites such as Flora Street Reserve, and Pollard Park on Kirrawee main street; and in long-undeveloped sites such as the old Kirrawee Brickpit and the Telstra depot (also a former brickpit). These latter sites are now subject to urban development plans.

It is estimated that only 0.5% of the original area of STIF remains in the Sydney region, with these small remnants now protected under the NSW Threatened Species Conservation Act 1995 and the Federal Environmental Protection and Biodiversity Conservation Act 1999. The main threat to the ecological community is clearing for urban development, and the subsequent impacts from fragmentation.

Kirrawee's protected areas of STIF are used to collect seeds that can be planted as street trees or on private property to assist in sustaining the biodiversity of the area and protecting the unique flora that provides habitat for native fauna. Kirrawee's STIF reserves are largely maintained by the local council and Bushcare volunteers from the community. The Sutherland Shire Council and Bushcare volunteers maintain a Plant Nursery that sells native plants sourced from local species, and its website includes a native plant selector that encourages locals to purchase and protect species suited to the local ecosystem.

== Kirrawee Brick Pit ==
External images
- Workers standing in front of the Kirrawee Brickpits, 1928-29
- Kirrawee Brickpits, looking south, ca. 1970s

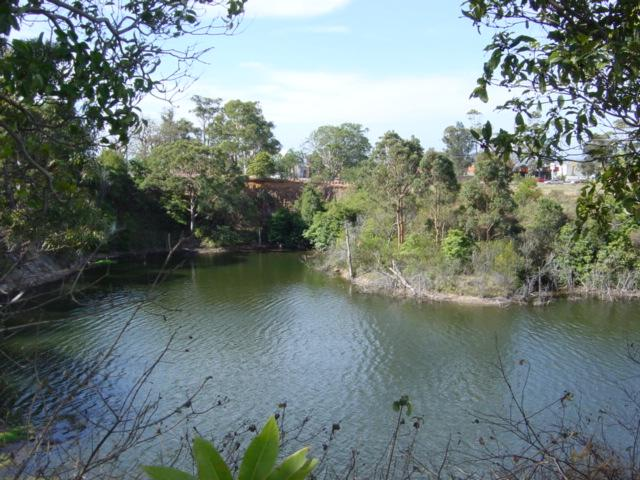
Brickpit in Kirrawee looking north, 2006.

Kirrawee's long-disused former brick pit is a 4.5ha site just north of the main shopping village, and its future has been the source of much debate by local residents, politicians, potential developers, and media in the locality.

Original development

Used for industrial purposes between 1912 and 1979, the land was owned by various brick manufacturers, including Sutherland Brick Co, Refractory Bricks, and Punchbowl Brick and Tile Co. The buildings on the site were demolished in 1968. Sydney Water Board acquired the land in 1974 for water-storage purposes, but instead it became an equipment storage facility.

Lagoon & wildlife habitat

Until recent development of the site, a deep pit covered approximately 50 - 60% of the total brick pit site and measured about 230 metres long by about 80 metres wide and was about 16 metres deep. The entire site was enclosed by a cyclone fence, preventing public access. Over many years, the pit had become half-filled with water, making a natural lagoon. The remainder of the site was covered with overgrown trees and plants and had become home to many diverse species of animals most notably bird life, which could be seen nesting and swimming on and around the water. The threatened Grey-headed Flying Fox has been observed drinking from the lake.

Re-development and controversy

This site has been the subject of much controversy over recent years.

When it was evident Sydney Water had no further use for the site, the State Government proposed to sell the site to developers for use as a mix of apartments, business units, and a small park. Kirrawee Chamber of Commerce and a residents' group instead proposed that the site be turned into a performing arts centre and large park.

In 2001, a 20-month program commenced to consult with the community about the future use of the site. This project was a joint initiative between the local council, the Department of Infrastructure, Planning and Natural Resources (DIPNR), Sydney Water (the then-owner of the site), and the local community. The Local Environment Plan (LEP) produced a master plan for the Kirrawee shopping village and brick pit which involved rezoning the site to a mix of commercial, residential, and 20% open public space.

In April 2005, after the election of a new councillor, 45 amendments were passed with regards to the LEP. Barry Collier was critical of these amendments, which changed the zoning to make the Princes Highway frontage commercial and the remainder "special uses". It was specifically noted that "...educational establishments are a permissible use in both zones".

Sutherland Shire Council moved to change the plan, but NSW state government Planning Minister, Frank Sartor cemented the original proposal in a rewritten local environment plan.

It was estimated in 2006 that there were 42.7 million litres of water in the brick pit lake.

In July 2007, a development group called Kirrawee Centre Pty Ltd, with directors including architect, George Revay, and brothers Stanley and John Roth, purchased the site from Sydney Water for $22.5million. The State Government had previously said the buyer would have to develop it in accordance with a comprehensive master plan, which includes a mix of multi-storey apartments, business units and a one-hectare public park.

In May 2008 a new development application was proposed for the site including a shopping centre with 2 supermarkets and 63 apartments.

The development tick-tacked between council and the developer and eventually a far more commercially based development proposal was lodged with the Land and Environment Court of NSW and heard over February, April, June and July 2009, with a judgement made on 7 August 2009. In the case of Restifa Pty Ltd v Sutherland Shire Council & Ors [2009] NSWLEC 1267, the developer appealed against the council's refusal of the development Master Plan for the site and of construction of Stage 1 for a mixed retail, commercial, residential development with a child care centre, basement car parking and open space recreation area. In the judgement, it was pointed out that, during the course of the hearing, there were many amendments and six sets of plans submitted. The retail component of the development was amended from the two supermarkets totalling about 7,000 square metres, with total retail 10,500 square metres, to a proposal of one 4,500 square metres supermarket and total retail of about 8,000 square metres. The development was ultimately rejected.

Most recent development proposals

In July 2010, Henroth Investments Pty Ltd, bypassed Sutherland Shire Council, lodging a new development application with the NSW Planning Department for a $220 million, nine-storey development, including nearly 500 residential units, over 13,500 square metres of retail space and 1,378 car spaces.

The local council at the time was "strongly opposed" to the project, and the developer took it to the Planning and Assessment Commission.

The Henroth application had 30 percent more units than the proposal refused by the Land and Environment Court in August 2009, which raised a number of concerns including the impact on retailers in Kirrawee and Sutherland, the design of the public open space, and the ecological impact. Local retailer Supabarn was one of many to protest strongly, particularly after the group spent $18 million to develop a supermarket site in nearby Sutherland.

In February 2011 the brick pit area was rezoned from public open space to being mixed use. On 28 August 2012 the re-development of Kirrawee Brick Pit was approved.

The Planning Assessment Commission in February 2015 approved the developer's concept plan modifications, allowing them to increase the number of apartments from 432 to 749. This was reported to be a blend of housing commission dwellings and general residential, but DeiCorp has stated that none of the 808 units of housing is planned to be affordable housing or public housing.

The developer of the South Village shopping centre at the brick pit site initially sought to include childcare facilities, but this was later scrapped due to concerns about pickup issues. It was suggested in local media that Sutherland Library may move its main branch to the South Village shopping centre, instead of having a "technology hub" at the site, but this idea was later scrapped. Roadworks have been completed on the Princes Highway, Oak Road and Flora Street to improve traffic flow to ameliorate the expected impact of the South Village shopping centre on traffic in Kirrawee. Over 1500 jobs were expected to be created by the South Village project, with hundreds of ongoing retail positions in the shopping centre. A 'technology-focused library and community hub' is planned to operate in the South Village complex, and will be considered in the Sutherland Shire Council's 2023-2024 budget if approved in April 2022.

== Transport ==
Kirrawee railway station is on the Cronulla line which links Sydney's southern suburbs to the CBD. Kirrawee is approximately 40 minutes by train to the CBD. Kirrawee was one of the last remaining single platform stations in Sydney. Duplication of the train line from Sutherland to Cronulla commenced in May 2006 and was completed in 2010.

Parts of Kirrawee are earmarked to become part of an extension to the Princes Motorway.

In 1940, a bus service ran from Hurstville to Kirrawee via Yowie Bay. U-Go Mobility operates two routes via President Avenue, near Kirrawee railway station:

- 976: Sutherland station to Grays Point
- 993: Westfield Miranda to Engadine

In addition to these bus services, as of 2017, part of Kirrawee south of the Princes Highway was served by the on-demand Transdevlink ride service pilot. The service was revised in January 2019, when all of Kirrawee was included. It ceased 17 November 2019.

On the day of the 2016 census, 19.8% of employed people in Kirrawee used public transport to get to work and 64.1% travelled by car.

== Schools ==
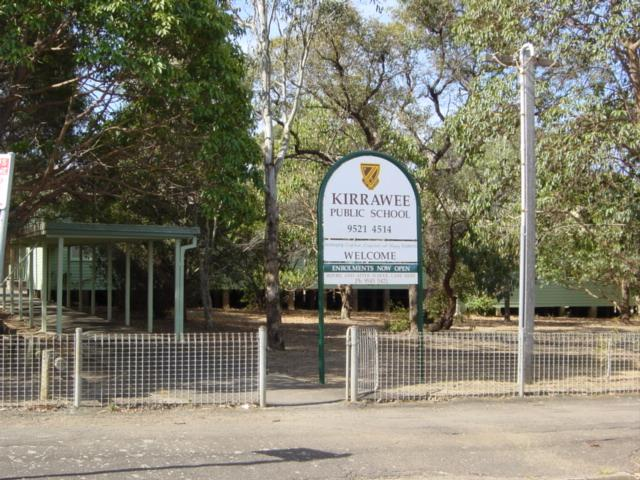
Kirrawee Public School

Education facilities within Kirrawee include Kirrawee High School and Kirrawee Public School, along with a number of pre-schools and childcare centres. Gymea Technology High School also lies on Kirrawee's outskirts.

== Churches ==
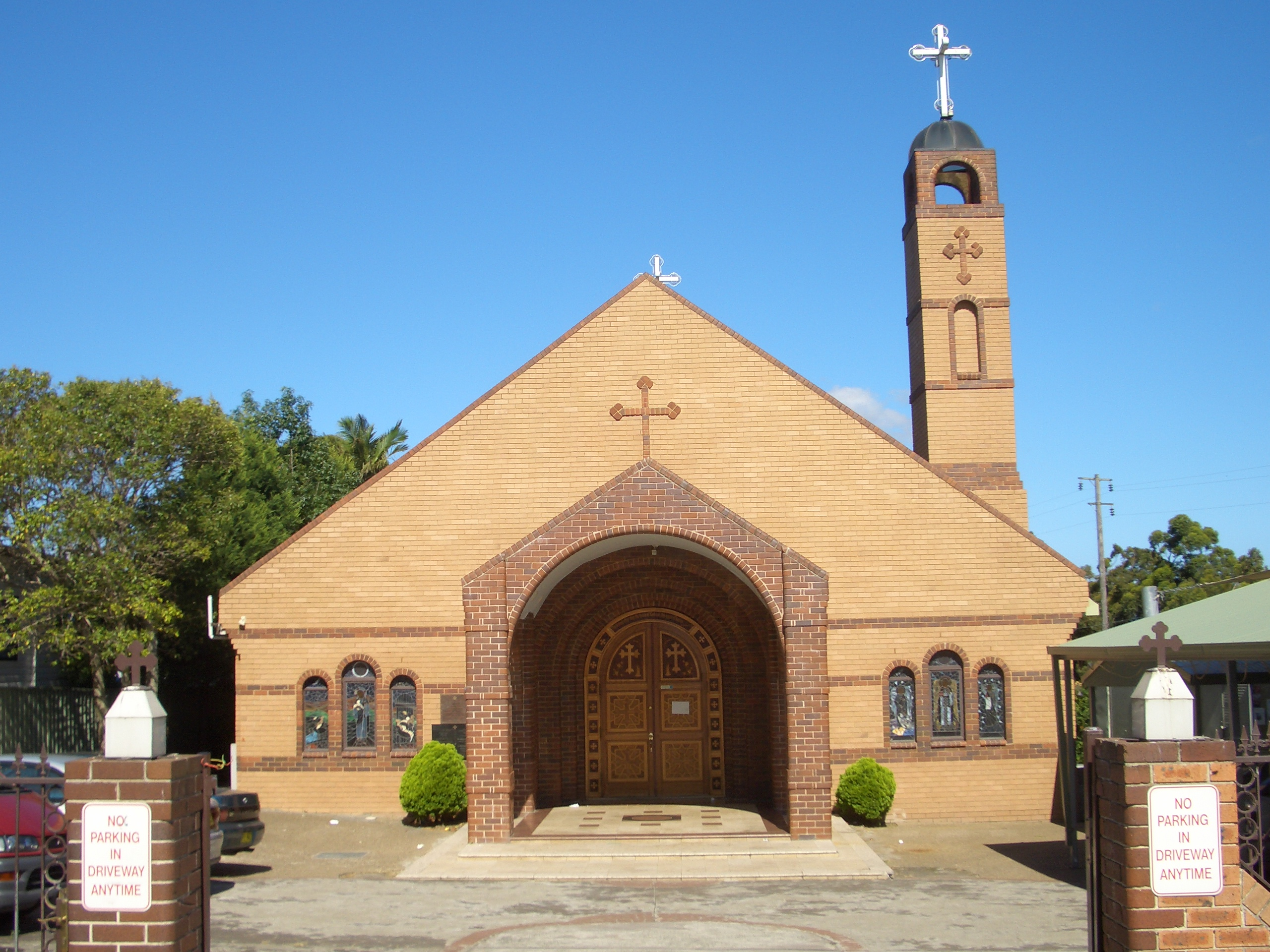
St. Mary, St.Bakhomious and St. Shenouda Coptic Orthodox Church, Kirrawee

St. Mary, St. Bakhomious and St. Shenouda Coptic Orthodox Church, located in Bath Road, was consecrated in 1996. The Soul Revival (Anglican) church meets in Flora Street, Kirrawee. The President Avenue Community Church meets in Kirrawee. There is a Latter Day Saint Ward in Bath Road, an outpost of the larger LDS church at Mortdale.

== Parks and sporting facilities ==
Helena Street has an off-leash dog park. Nearby, the Kirrawee Oval provides a floodlighted sporting facility. Kirrawee Oval is used by the St. Patrick's Sutherland Football Club.

Bowie Park, Betham Place Reserve, Nyrang Place Reserve, Flora Street Reserve, Tea Tree Street Reserve, and Biddy Giles Park provide playgrounds.

A lawn bowls club operates in Oak Road, named Club Kirrawee.

There is an indoor climbing centre in Waratah Street, Kirrawee.

== Population ==
According to the 2021 census of Population, there were 11,007 people in Kirrawee.

- Aboriginal and Torres Strait Islander people made up 1.2% of the population.
- 75.0% of people were born in Australia. The next most common countries of birth were England 3.6%, China 2.2% and New Zealand 1.7%.
- 79.2% of people spoke only English at home. Other languages spoken at home included Mandarin 2.4% and Cantonese 1.4%.
- The most common responses for religion were No Religion 35.8%, Catholic 25.7% and Anglican 15.6%.

== Politics ==
Kirrawee is part of the Sutherland Shire Government Area in Southern Sydney. For local government purposes, the Sutherland Shire is split into 5 wards, A through to E. These wards are reviewed every 4 years. Kirrawee is split between Wards D, B and C.

At state level, some of Kirrawee is located within the seat of Miranda, some of Kirrawee is located within the seat of Cronulla, and some of Kirrawee is located within the seat of Heathcote.

In the federal parliament, Kirrawee is in the electorate of Cook. Between the redistribution of February 2016 and the redistribution of 2024 it was in Hughes. Prior to this, some of Kirrawee was within Cook.
