= Sutherland Shire =

- Local government area
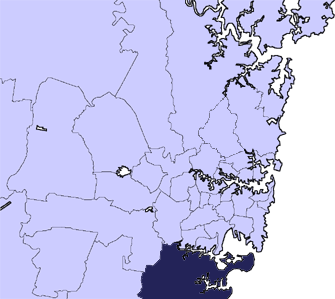
- Location in Metropolitan Sydney

- Interactive map of Sutherland Shire
- Coordinates: 34°02′S 151°03′E
- Country: Australia
- State: New South Wales
- Region: Metropolitan Sydney
- Established: 6 March 1906
- Council seat: Council Chambers Sutherland

Government
  - Mayor: Jack Boyd
  - State electorates: Cronulla; Heathcote; Holsworthy; Miranda
  - Federal divisions: Cook; Hughes

Area
  - Total: 370 km^{2} (140 sq mi)

Population
  - Totals: 218,464 (2016 census) (13th); 229,213 (2018 est.)
  - Density: 590/km^{2} (1,529/sq mi)
- Website: Sutherland Shire
LGAs around Sutherland Shire
Canterbury Bankstown	Georges River	Bayside & Randwick
Liverpool	Sutherland Shire	Tasman Sea
Campbelltown	Wollongong

Sutherland Shire is a local government area (LGA) in the southern region of Sydney, in the state of New South Wales, Australia.

Geographically, it is the area directly to the south of Botany Bay and the Georges River. Sutherland Shire is 26 kilometres (16 mi) south-southwest of the Sydney CBD, and is bordered by the Bayside Council, City of Canterbury-Bankstown, Georges River Council and the City of Wollongong local government areas.

As at the 2021 census, Sutherland Shire has an estimated population of 230,211. The area is colloquially known as "The Shire", and has featured in several reality television series.

The administrative centre of Sutherland Shire is located in the suburb of Sutherland, with the council chambers located on Eton Street. As of 10 October 2024, the mayor of the Sutherland Shire is Cr. Jack Boyd, a Labor Party member.

Sutherland Shire contains what was the first landing site of Lieutenant James Cook, who went ashore onto what is now the suburb of Kurnell on 29 April 1770. It was originally intended to be the location of the first British Settlement, before Sydney Cove was chosen instead by Arthur Phillip, captain of the First Fleet.

== Suburbs and localities in the local government area ==
A geoshape of the Sutherland Shire

Suburbs in Sutherland Shire are:

- Alfords Point
- Bangor
- Barden Ridge
- Bonnet Bay
- Bundeena
- Burraneer
- Caringbah
- Caringbah South
- Como
- Cronulla
- Dolans Bay
- Engadine
- Grays Point
- Greenhills Beach
- Gymea
- Gymea Bay
- Heathcote
- Holsworthy (shared with City of Liverpool and City of Campbelltown)
- Illawong
- Jannali
- Kangaroo Point
- Kareela
- Kirrawee
- Kurnell
- Lilli Pilli
- Loftus
- Lucas Heights
- Maianbar
- Menai
- Miranda
- Oyster Bay
- Port Hacking
- Sandy Point
- Sutherland
- Sylvania
- Sylvania Waters
- Taren Point
- Waterfall
- Woolooware
- Woronora
- Woronora Heights
- Yarrawarrah
- Yowie Bay

Localities and features within Sutherland Shire include:

- Audley
- Caravan Head
- Como West
- Gundamaian
- Royal National Park
- Sylvania Heights
- Warumbul
- Woronora Dam

== Demographics ==
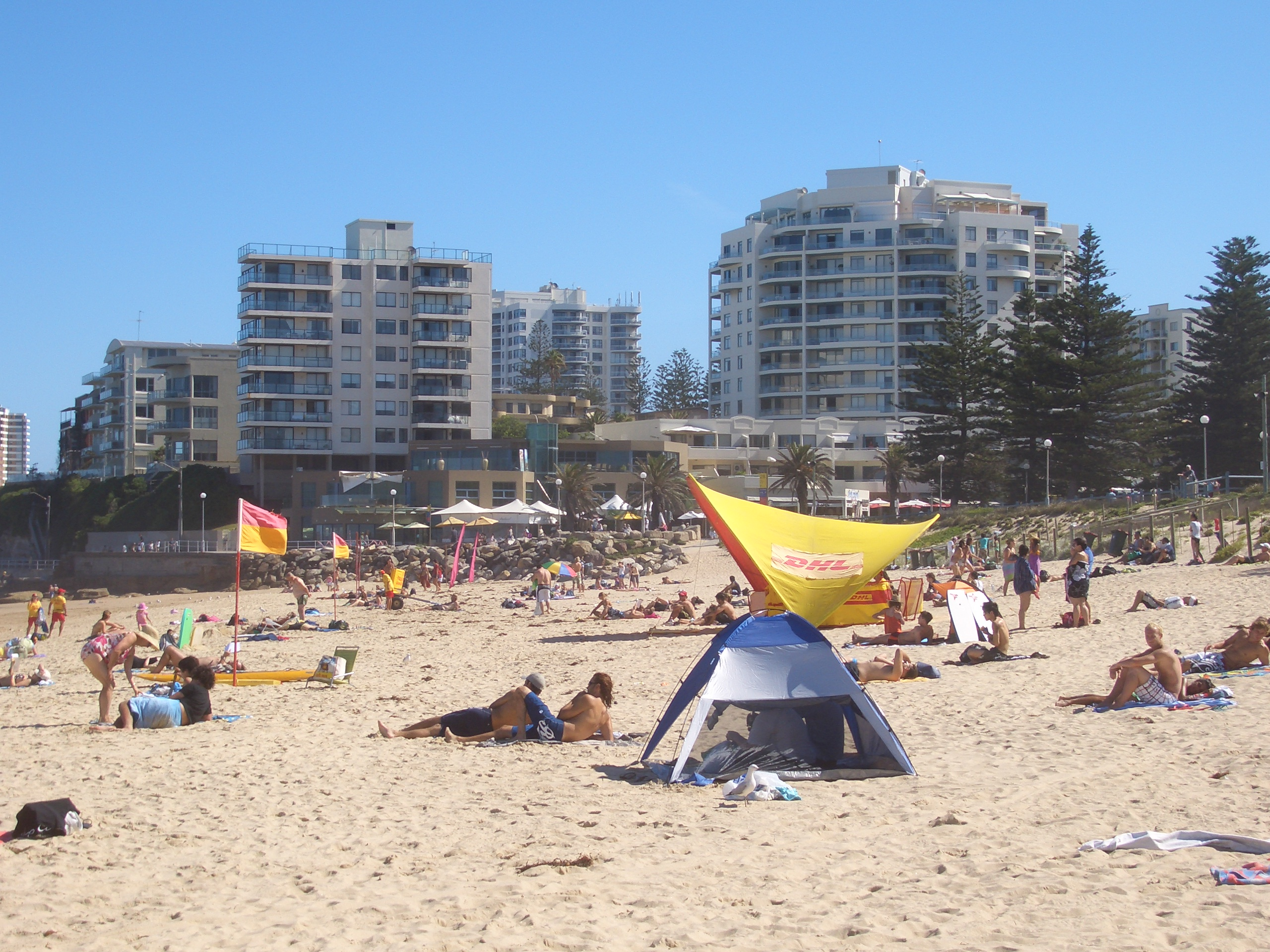
People on North Cronulla Beach

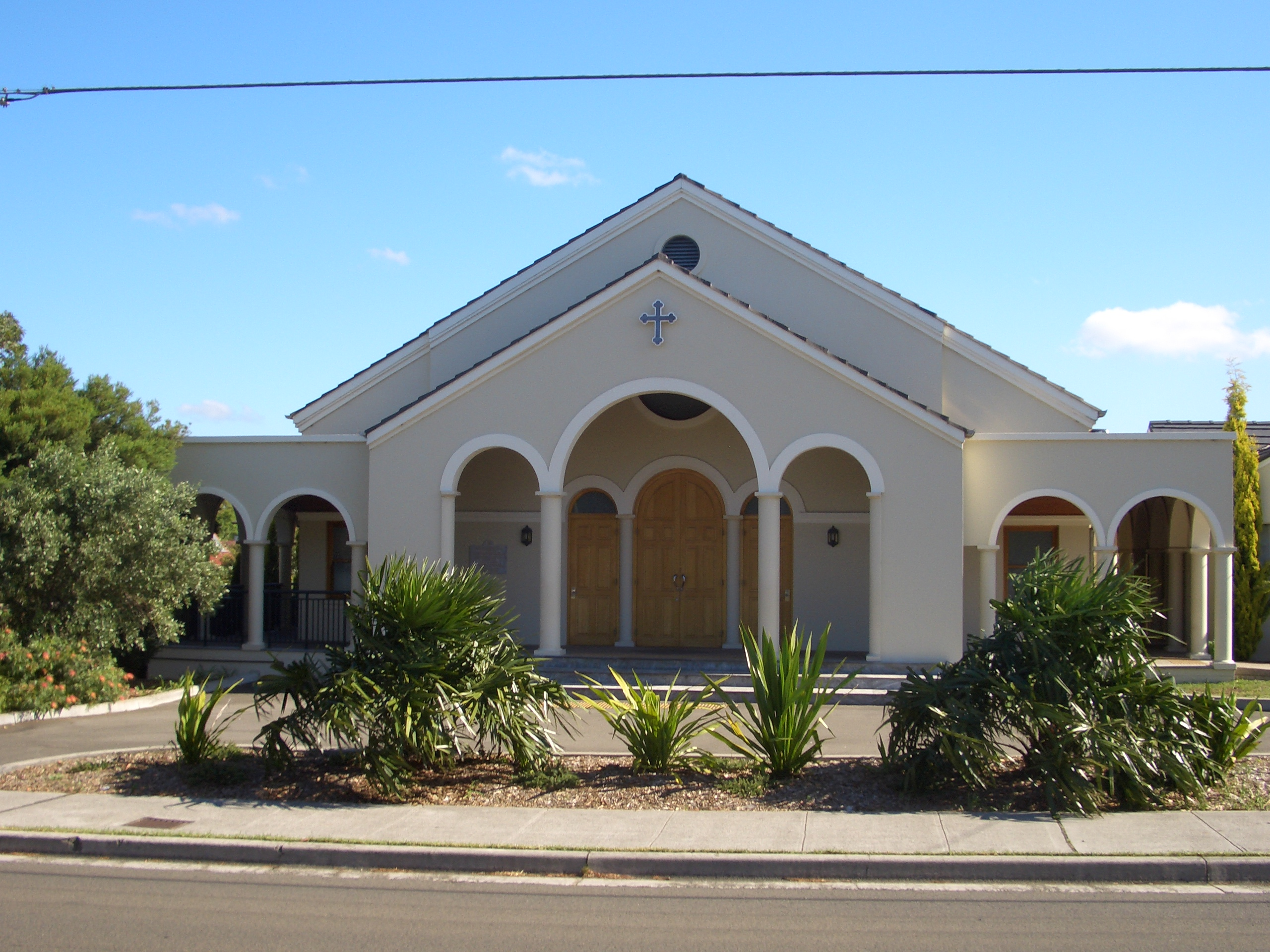
St Stylianos Greek Orthodox Church, Gymea

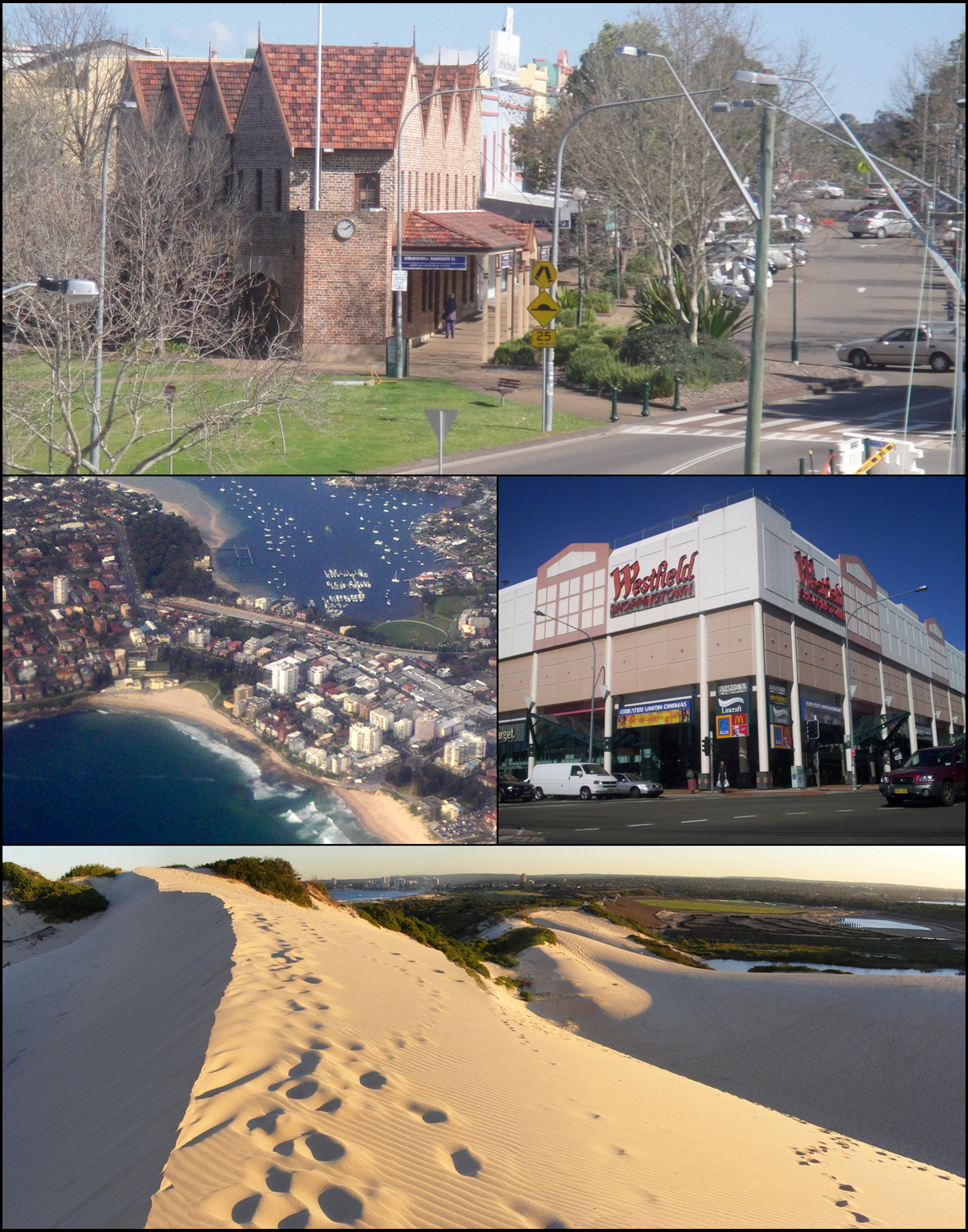
Left to right from top: The suburb of Sutherland; Cronulla and beaches; Westfield, Miranda; Kurnell Sand Dunes.

At the 2021 census, there were 230,211 people in Sutherland Shire. Of these, 48.9% were male and 51.1% were female. Indigenous Australians made up 1.4% of the population. The median age of people in Sutherland Shire was 41 years. Children aged 0–14 years made up 18.5% of the population and people aged 65 years and over made up 18.8% of the population. Of all the people in Sutherland Shire aged 15 years and over, 52.2% were married and 10.6% were either separated or divorced.

The median weekly income for residents within Sutherland Shire was higher than the national average.

The most common ancestries in Sutherland Shire were English 38.0%, Australian 35.6%, Irish 12.4%, Scottish 9.6% and Italian 4.9%. In The Shire, of all occupied private dwellings, 5.3% had 1 bedroom, 21.9% had 2 bedrooms and 32.9% had 3 bedrooms. The average number of bedrooms per occupied private dwelling was 3.2. The average household size was 2.7 people.

Selected historical census data for Sutherland Shire
Census year		2001	2006	2011	2016
Population	Estimated residents on census night	202,158	205,448	210,863	218,464
Population	LGA rank in terms of size within New South Wales		2nd	7th	6th
Population	% of New South Wales population			3.05%	2.82%
Population	% of Australian population	1.08%	▼1.03%	▼0.98%	▼0.90%
Cultural and language diversity					
Ancestry, top responses	Australian			28.9%	26.3%
Ancestry, top responses	English			28.0%	27.6%
Ancestry, top responses	Irish			9.0%	9.5%
Ancestry, top responses	Scottish			6.6%	6.9%
Ancestry, top responses	Italian			3.0%	3.2%
Language, top responses (other than English)	Greek	1.9%	1.9%	1.9%	1.9%
Language, top responses (other than English)	Arabic	1.0%	1.0%	▼0.9%	0.9%
Language, top responses (other than English)	Cantonese	1.0%	1.0%	▼0.9%	▲1.0%
Language, top responses (other than English)	Italian	1.1%	▼0.9%	0.9%	▼0.8%
Language, top responses (other than English)	Mandarin	n/c	▲0.6%	▲0.7%	▲1.4%
Religious affiliation					
Religious affiliation, top responses	Catholic	30.5%	▲30.6%	▲31.0%	▼29.2%
Religious affiliation, top responses	Anglican	28.7%	▼26.9%	▼25.8%	▼20.7%
Religious affiliation, top responses	No religion	10.8%	▲12.9%	▲16.1%	▲24.1%
Religious affiliation, top responses	Eastern Orthodox	3.6%	▲4.1%	▲4.3%	▼4.2%
Religious affiliation, top responses	Uniting Church	5.9%	▼5.0%	▼4.2%	
Median weekly incomes					
Personal income	Median weekly personal income		A$601	A$718	A$837
Personal income	% of Australian median income		129.0%	124.4%	126.4%
Family income	Median weekly family income		A$1,374	A$2,014	A$2,312
Family income	% of Australian median income		133.8%	136.0%	133.3%
Household income	Median weekly household income		A$1,650	A$1,674	A$1,979
Household income	% of Australian median income		140.9%	135.7%	137.6%

== Presidents and Mayors ==
=== Sutherland Shire Presidents 1906–1993 ===
Mayor	Term	Notes
W. G. Judd	1906–1910	
E. W. Hyndman	1911–1915	
R. W. Cook	1916	
Cecil Monro	1917–1918	
J. Hill	1918	
W. R. Ainsworth	1919–1921	
Cecil Monro	1922–1927	
R. W. Cook	1928	
A. J. Hand	1929	
E. S. Shaw	1930–1933	
R. Bingham	1934	
E. S. Shaw	1935–1938	
Cecil Monro	1939	
R. Bingham	1940–1942	
A. H. Tucker	1943	
E. S. Shaw	1944	
L. J. Sandow	1945	
J. W. H. Lawrence	1946	
J. Skillcorn	1947	
W. E. Peisley	1948	
Cecil Monro	1949–1951	
Reginald H. Doneathy	1952	
Darrell G. Welch	1953	
Arthur G. Harper	1954	
Ronald J. O'Brien	1955–1956	
John A. Dwyer	1957–1958	
Horace J. Cartledge	1959	
John A. Dwyer	1960	
Arthur Gietzelt	1961–1963	
Keith Bates	1964–1965	
Arthur Gietzelt	1966–1971	
Ray Thorburn	1972	
Kevin Skinner	1973–1974	
Peter Lewis	1974–1975	
Michael T. P. Tynan	1975–1978	
Jean M. Manuel, MBE	1978–1979	
Allan Andrews	1979–1981	
Kevin Skinner	1981–1986	
Ian B. Swords	1986–1987	
Carol Provan	1987–1988	
Michael T. P. Tynan	1988–1989	
Douglas T. McNeil	1989–1990	
Don R. Carter	1990–1991	
Ian B. Swords	1991–1993	

=== Mayors of Sutherland Shire, 1993–present ===
Mayor	Party	Term	Notes
Ian B. Swords	Labor	1 July 1993 – 1994	
Genevieve Rankin	Labor	1994–1995	
Lorraine Rodden	Independent	1995–1996	
Kevin Schreiber	Liberal	1996–1999	
Ken McDonell	Labor	1999–2000	
Tracie Sonda	Shire Watch	2000–2002	
Phil Blight	Labor	2002–2004	
Kevin Schreiber	Liberal	2004–2006	
David Redmond	Liberal	2006–2008	
Lorraine Kelly	Shire Watch	2008–2010	
Phil Blight	Labor	2010–2011	
Carol Provan	Independent	2011–2012	
Kent Johns	Liberal	2012–2013	
Steve Simpson	Liberal	2013–2014	
Kent Johns	Liberal	2014–2015	
Carmelo Pesce	Liberal	2015–2020	
Steve Simpson	Independent	2020–2022	
Carmelo Pesce	Liberal	2022–2024	
Jack Boyd	Labor	2024–present	

== Council ==
=== Current composition and election method ===
Sutherland Shire Council is composed of fifteen councillors elected proportionally as five separate wards, each electing three councillors. All councillors are elected for a fixed four-year term of office. The mayor is elected by the councillors at the first meeting of the council. The most recent election was held on 14 September 2024, and the makeup of the council is as follows:

Party	Councillors
Liberal	6
Labor	5
Independent	4
Total	15

The current Council, elected in 2024, in order of election by ward, is:

Ward	Councillor	Party	Notes
A Ward	Kal Glanznig	Independent	Elected 2024
A Ward	Carol Provan	Independent	Elected 2008; Councillor 1983–1991; Mayor 2011–2012; Deputy Mayor 2022–2024
A Ward	Marcelle Elzerman	Liberal	Elected 2021
B Ward	Melanie Gibbons	Liberal	Elected 2024; Councillor 2004–2012
B Ward	Joanne Nicholls	Liberal	Elected 2021
B Ward	Jack Boyd	Labor	Elected 2016; Mayor 2024–present
C Ward	Jen Armstrong	Labor	Elected 2021
C Ward	Carmelo Pesce	Independent	Elected 2012; Mayor 2015–2020 & 2022–2024
C Ward	Haris Strangas	Liberal	Elected 2021
D Ward	Meredith Laverty	Liberal	Elected 2024
D Ward	Diedree Steinwall	Labor	Elected 2012
D Ward	Peter Tsambalas	Labor	Elected 2024
E Ward	Mick Maroney	Labor	Elected 2024
E Ward	Stephen Nikolovski	Liberal	Elected 2021
E Ward	Laura Cowell	Independent	Elected 2021; Deputy Mayor 2024–present

=== Past composition ===
Election	Seats					
Election	Labor	Liberal	Ind. Liberal	Shire Watch	Comm. First	Independent (Note: Including local groups.)
1999	5	4	—N/a	4	—N/a	2
2004	3	7	—N/a	4	—N/a	1
2008	3	—N/a	4	5	2	1
2012	3	9	—N/a	1	—N/a	2
2016	7	7	—N/a	—N/a	—N/a	1
2021	5	8	—N/a	—N/a	—N/a	2
2024	5	6	—N/a	—N/a	—N/a	4

== Election results ==
=== 2024 ===
2024 New South Wales local elections: Sutherland
Party	Votes	%	Swing	Seats	Change
Liberal	58,293	40.51%		6	
Labor	43,831	30.46%		5	
Shire Independents	9,345	6.49%		0	
Greens	3,207	2.23%		0	
The Passmore Independents	2,622	1.82%		0	
Libertarian	2,217	1.54%		0	
Animal Justice	1,486	1.03%		0	
Independents	22,901	15.91%		4	
Formal votes	143,902	94.97%			
Informal votes	7,617	5.03%			
Total	151,519			15	
Registered voters / turnout					

== History ==
=== Aboriginal history ===
The original inhabitants of the area of Sutherland Shire were some clans of the Dharawal people. Archaeological work in the Shire has revealed evidence for Aboriginal settlement dating back at least 8,500 years. The original coastline around Sydney has retreated about 20 km and that those flooded coastal plains may hold evidence showing occupation of this area going back well beyond the 8,500 years revealed in the 1966 Archaeological exploration.

Seashells became an important source of lime in the 1800s, and so, many middens in the Shire may have been mined for shells in order to produce mortar for construction.

Within the Royal National Park, field surveys have revealed many hundreds of Aboriginal rock shelters. In other locations (the military area near Holsworthy and Darkes Forrest) there are thousands of ancient campsites and sacred places. These areas mentioned have seen less impact by European settlement than the urban areas, and may give a clearer example of the quality of life and the abundance of resources in the Sutherland/Liverpool area.

Since 1966, when there was an archaeological dig in Cabbage Tree Basin, archaeologists have uncovered parts of an extensive open-air midden or cooking and camp sites. Successive layers of habitation show the diet of the native Aboriginal people: oysters, mussels, snapper, bream, and Sydney cockle. There is also evidence of seal, dolphin, a range of marsupials, dingo and even whale. Several edge-ground axes have also been found.

There are many places where paintings and engravings of great age show changes in art style over thousands of years. Some of these changes can be linked to the extinction of animals in the local area and to the arrival of Europeans. Some have interpreted these artistic changes to changes in culture and people which would indicate that there have been a number of changes of communities over time. Since 2023, there have been some efforts to revive Dharawal culture and language, with 4,000 copies of a Dharawal picture dictionary provided to local schools.

=== European settlement ===
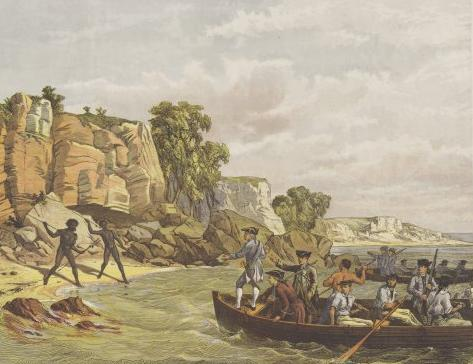
Cook landing at Botany Bay

European discovery of what is now Sutherland Shire was made by Lieutenant James Cook, who entered Botany Bay on 29 April 1770. Cook and his party explored around Kurnell Peninsula, and left the bay on 6 May. During their brief stay, a Scottish seaman named Forbes Sutherland died of tuberculosis. In his honour, Cook named the northwest point of the peninsula Point Sutherland.

The British government needed a new site for transported convicts as they had lost their American colonies following defeat in the American Revolutionary War. Botany Bay was chosen as the new penal settlement and the First Fleet under Governor Arthur Phillip anchored off Kurnell on 18 January 1788. After sending a party to clear land for settlement, Phillip soon realised the area was unsuitable. There was lack of shelter for ships, inadequate water and poor soil. On 24 January, two French ships were sighted off the coast, causing Phillip to raise English colours near Sutherland Point. Governor Phillip sailed north to explore Port Jackson, and eventually settled at Sydney Cove.

The first landowner in Sutherland Shire was James Birnie, a mercantile trader who was granted by promise 700 acres (280 ha) at Kurnell in 1815. After the completion of official surveying, a large part of what is now Sutherland Shire was proclaimed as the Hundred of Woronora by Governor Richard Bourke in 1835. Title to land was not granted by the Crown until 1856, before which there was practically no settlement. Timber cutting was the primary industry, supplemented by shell gathering in the Port Hacking area.

With the opening of Crown Lands sales in the Sutherland Shire, Thomas Holt purchased 12,000 acres (4,900 ha). His developmental projects included oyster farms, cattle grazing, and coal mining. The investment which proved profitable however, were his timber leases. He constructed a magnificent manor on the foreshores of Sylvania, called Sutherland House, based on English feudal lines. Due to 99-year leases, Holt's estate reduced development in the Sutherland Shire even into the 20th century.

=== Development of transport ===
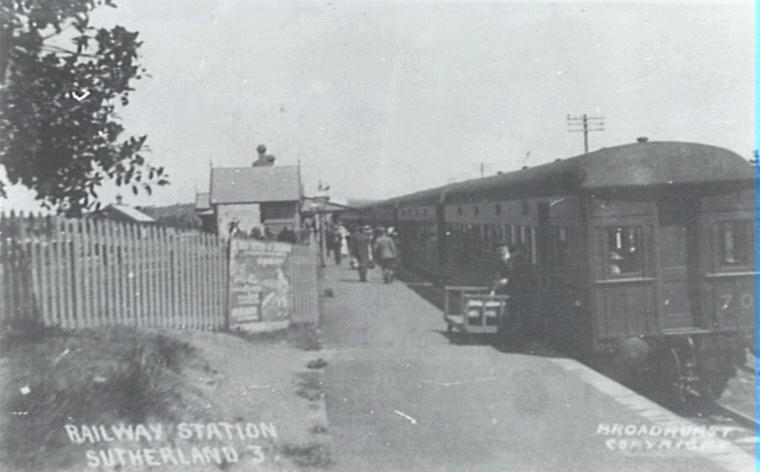
A train in Sutherland circa 1920

The main mode of transport in the area was originally by water. Farmers' ships sailed up the coast into Botany Bay, and up the Georges and Woronora rivers, avoiding the wharfage and custom dues at Port Jackson. The first public road, the Illawarra Road (now called the Old Illawarra Road) to Wollongong, was constructed between 1842 and 1845 with convict labour. A new southern line of road was completed in 1864, linking up with the Illawarra Road at Engadine. Today this virtually is the line of the Princes Highway, the main north–south thoroughfare through Sutherland Shire.

A railway line was extended from Hurstville in 1884 to develop the rich Illawarra district. The Illawarra railway line brought into being firstly a huge shanty town on the heights of Como, and later developed the area into a holiday centre. Sutherland railway station was opened in 1885, named after John Sutherland, a Minister of Works.

Panorama of Caringbah, circa 1920

At this time, the greater part of the Sutherland Shire was connected only by access tracks. A road soon opened between the railway station and Cronulla Beach, catering mostly to families and fishing parties. This was followed by the Sutherland-Cronulla steam tram service, which was inaugurated in 1911. Not only did the service greatly increase the popularity of the Cronulla beaches, but it was of great advantage to the slowly developing business interests in the Sutherland Shire.

Increasing motor traffic caused a falling-off of passengers and the tram passenger service closed in 1931. The goods service ceased the following year. Increased road traffic with the north led to the opening of the first road bridge into the shire, Tom Uglys Bridge, in 1929. The six-lane Captain Cook Bridge over the Georges River, spanning Rocky Point and Taren Point, was opened in 1965, replacing the completely inadequate ferry service.

=== Residential development ===
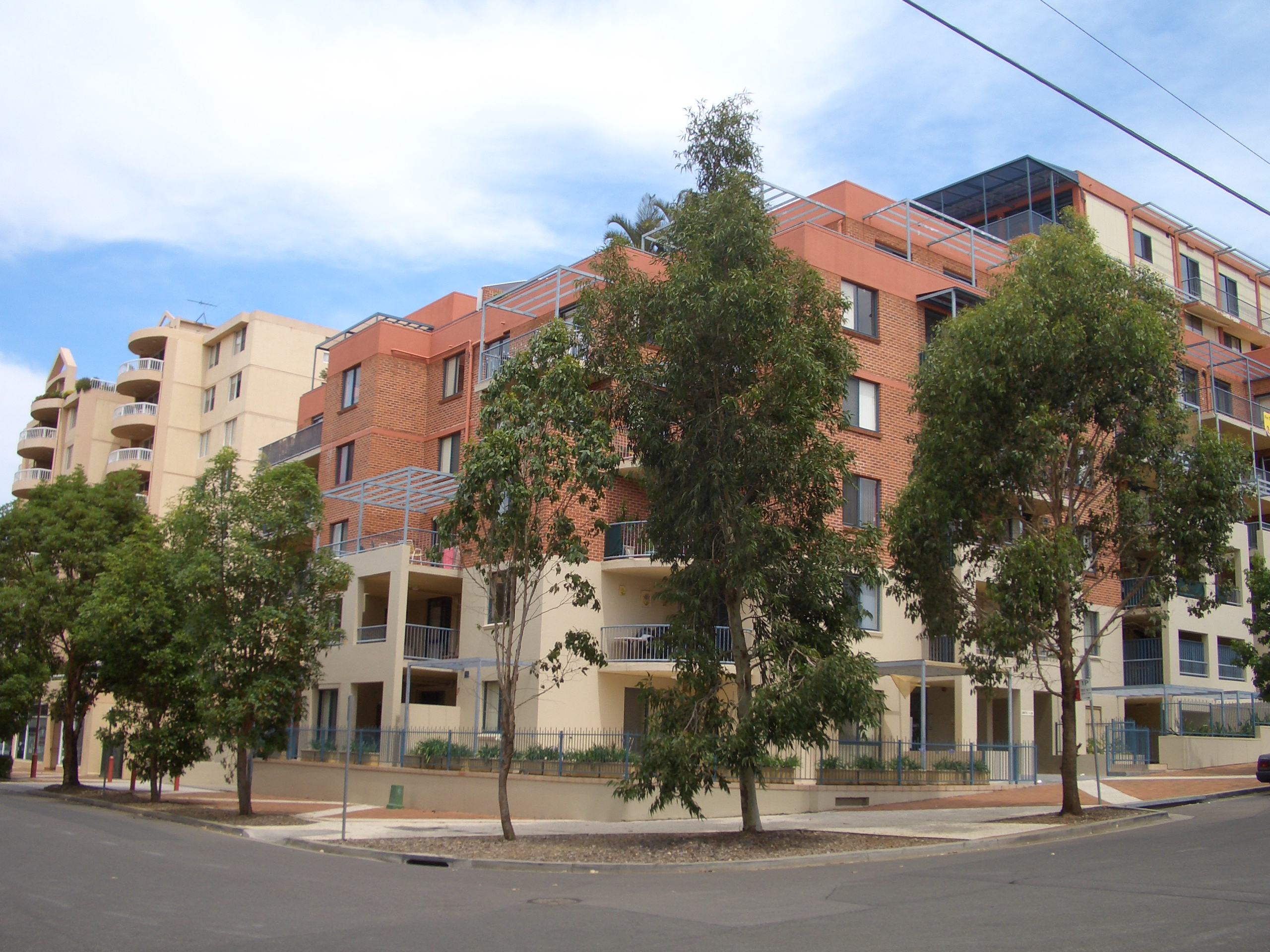
Flats in Miranda

Coastal and river frontage areas, such as Como, Illawong, Cronulla, Illawarra and Yowie Bay, became popular as country retreats. A form of voluntary local government was attempted in 1888, but law and order was still administered by the court at Liverpool until 1905. In that year, the Local Government (Shires) Act 1905 (NSW) provided that the whole of New South Wales be divided into shires. The State Governor, Harry Rawson selected the name, and proclaimed this district "Sutherland, No. 133" on 6 March 1906 and fixed the boundaries. At the time, Sutherland Shire had 1600 residents, and was divided into three ridings.

With only a small rates base, one of the early problems for the council was the provision of new roads. The construction of the Sutherland-Cronulla tramway by the Railways Commission went far in stimulating business activity and driving land sales. The population of Sutherland Shire increased from 2,896 in 1911, when the tramway opened, to over 7,500 in 1913. By 1931 the population had exceeded 12,000.

After the Second World War, the Housing Commission, under the auspices of William McKell, began acquiring land to build "homes for heroes", including in the Shire. It was not until the early 1950s that this district of scattered dwellings, vacant blocks and quiet villages became a suburban area of Sydney. Until this time, Sutherland Shire was not considered part of the Sydney Urban Area, but was part of Metropolitan Sydney.

In terms of residential development, one of the most imaginative homebuilding concepts has been Sylvania Waters. In this community, individually designed family homes were built around a series of man-made canals. The urban release of land in the Menai district, to the west of the Woronora River, commenced in the 1970s.

=== Economic development ===
Associated with this growth of population was industrial, social and commercial development. The Sutherland Shire Libraries system was established in 1953 in a former doctor's home at Sutherland with 8,000 books. The Captain Cook Drive from Caringbah to Kurnell was constructed in 1953 in conjunction with the establishment in 1956 of the Kurnell Refinery. In the suburb of Lucas Heights, the Australian Atomic Energy Commission, which is now organised as the Australian Nuclear Science and Technology Organisation (ANSTO), established its main research campus and its first nuclear reactor (HIFAR) in 1956. The reactor went critical on 26 January 1958, before shutting down and undergoing decommissioning in early 2007. The shire is also home to the Lucas Heights Resource Recovery Park, one of New South Wales' largest waste management facilities and the only remaining putrescible landfill in the Sydney Basin.

=== Contemporary history ===
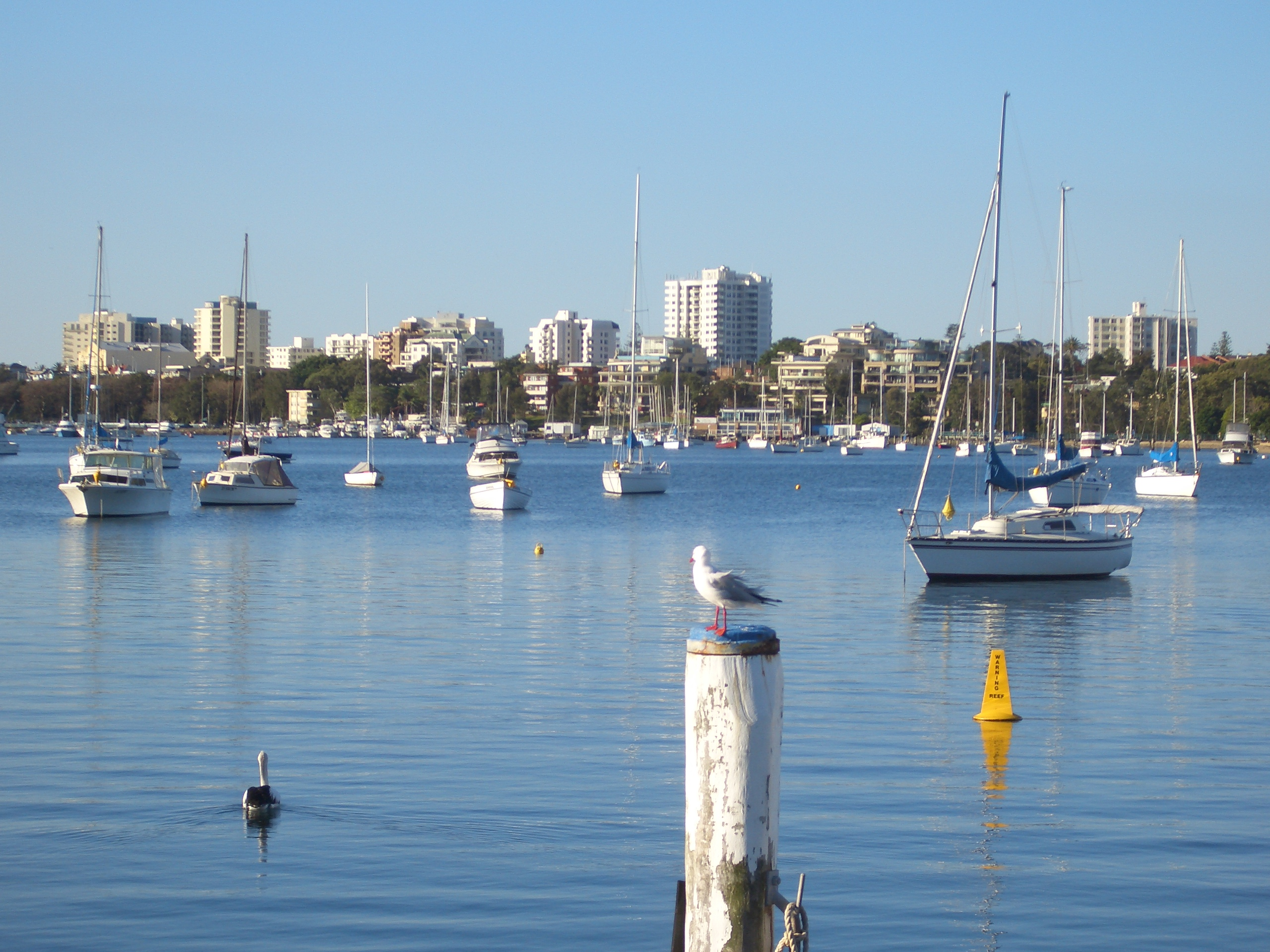
View of Cronulla from Burraneer

In January 1994, the 1994 Eastern seaboard fires destroyed parts of Como West, Jannali and Bonnet Bay; and affected the southern suburbs of Bundeena, Maianbar and Heathcote.

In the 2011 census, Sutherland Shire was the second most populous local government area in New South Wales, and eighth in Australia overall.

In December 2005, following incidents at the Cronulla beaches culminating in an assault on a lifeguard by youth of Lebanese descent, an anonymous text message, publicised by major media outlets in Australia, called on people to gather at Cronulla beach on the following Sunday and attack "wogs and lebs". On 11 December 2005 and the days that followed, a series of riots and retaliatory attacks broke out in Cronulla and other beach-side suburbs in Sydney's east which saw numerous assaults. There were two non-fatal stabbings and property damage, especially to motor vehicles. There were many people arrested, over one hundred charged, and extensive national and international media interest.

The Sutherland Shire is home to a population of approximately 140 koalas, which are an endangered species.

== Heritage listings ==
Sutherland Shire has a number of heritage-listed sites, including:

- Audley, Sir Bertram Stevens & Audley Road: Audley historic recreational complex
- Caringbah South, 44-46 Fernleigh Road: Fernleigh, Caringbah South
- Cronulla, Captain Cook Drive: Cronulla sand dunes
- Cronulla, Cronulla railway: Cronulla railway station
- Cronulla, 202 Nicholson Parade: Cronulla Fisheries Centre
- Dolans Bay, 733 Port Hacking Road: Lyons House, Sydney
- Heathcote, 1-21 Dillwynnia Grove: Heathcote Hall
- Kurnell, Cape Solander Drive: Kamay Botany Bay National Park
- Loftus, Illawarra railway: Loftus Junction railway signal box
- Woronora Dam (suburb): Woronora Dam

== Geography ==
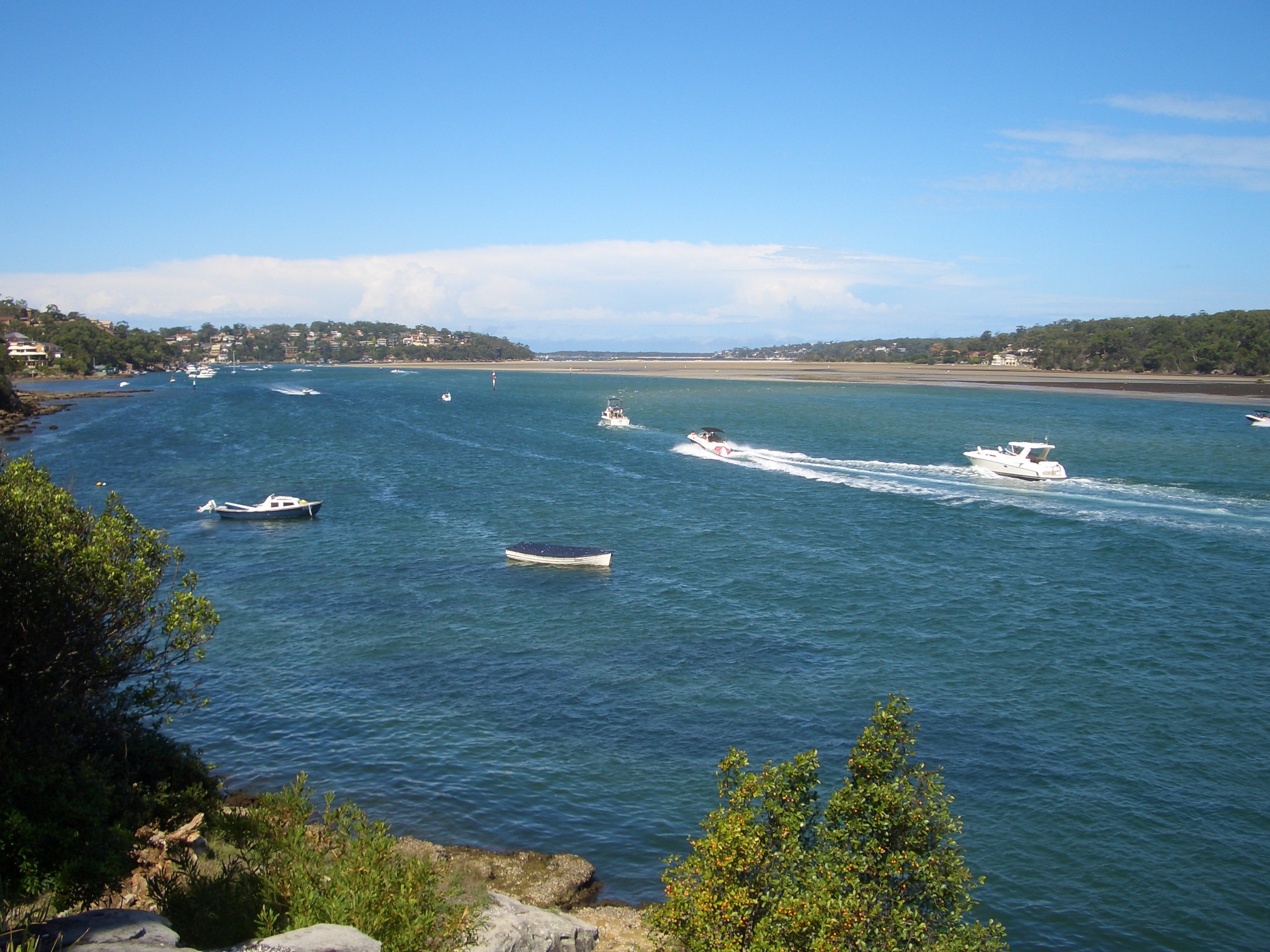
Port Hacking estuary

Under the 1853 proclamation, the western boundary of district was the Woronora River. With the establishment of the Sutherland Shire on 6 March 1906, the western boundary was extended to take in more agricultural land in an area which is now modern day Menai. In 1919, the Illawong area was also transferred to the council. The Shire now has an area of 370 square kilometres (140 sq mi), of which 173 square kilometres (67 sq mi) is state-designated national parkland.

The northern border of the Sutherland Shire can be crossed via four bridges: three road bridges (Alfords Point, Tom Uglys and Captain Cook) and the Como railway bridge. To the west, the Heathcote Road leading out of the Sutherland Shire passes by the Holsworthy military reserve. To the south, the Princes Highway runs out of Waterfall towards the City of Wollongong. The eastern border is bounded by the Tasman Sea. In the eastern part the Sutherland Shire has a varying landscape of rugged sea cliffs and sandy beaches, and swampy bay coasts backed by sand dunes. To the west the surface consists of a broad plateau rising gently to the southwest, and cut into by several deep river gorges.

The Lucas Heights Conservation Area is a 111.7-hectare (276-acre) bushland reserve in the western part of the Sutherland Shire. The reserve protects native woodland, heath and sedgeland within the Mill Creek catchment.

=== Geology ===
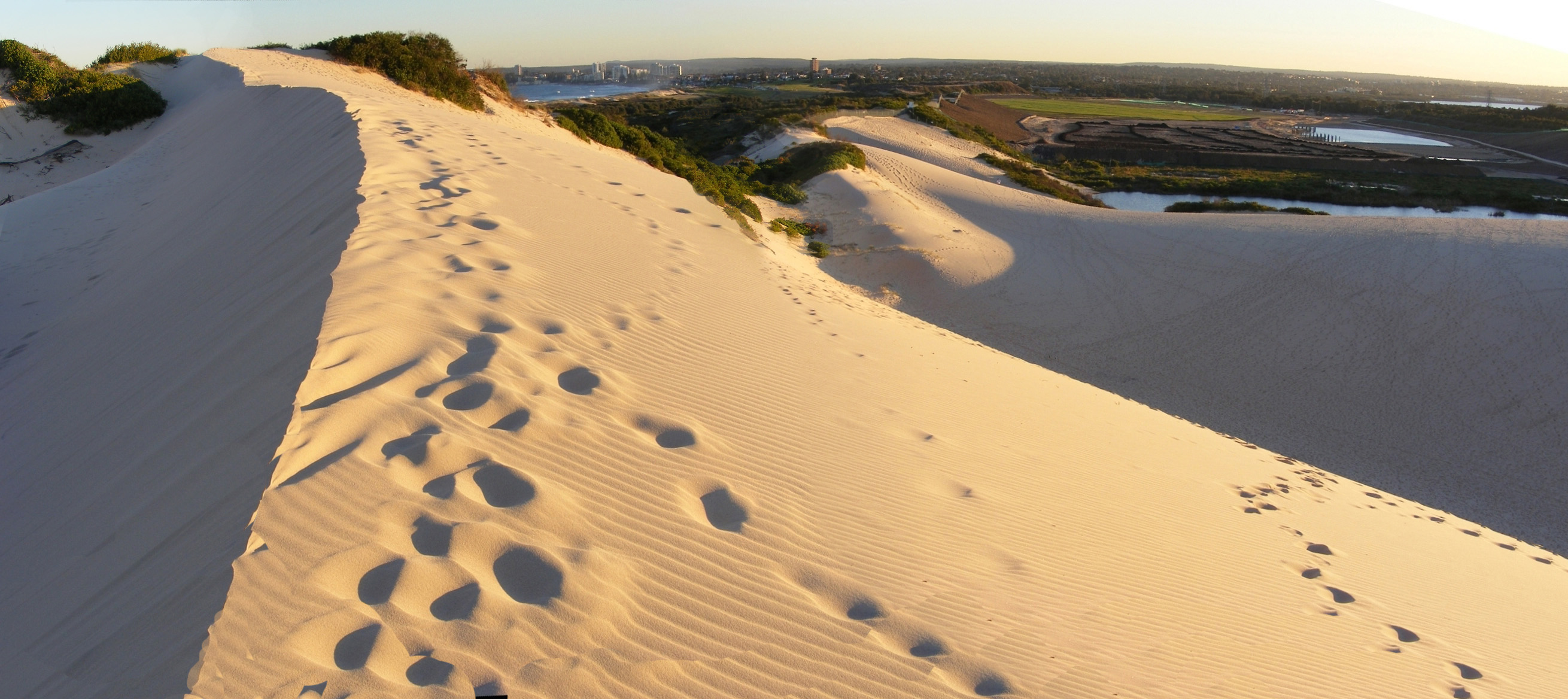
Cronulla sand dunes

The geology of Sutherland Shire, whilst sharing characteristics with the North Shore, is very different from the western and central suburbs of Sydney. Above the coal-bearing rocks is found the Narrabeen Group, mostly made up of layers of sandstone and characteristic red claystone beds. Overlying the Narrabeen Group is the Hawkesbury Sandstone, the rock unit most characteristic of the Shire. Occasional patches of Ashfield shale overlay the Hawkesbury sandstone. Some time later than the Triassic period – possibly early Tertiary – minor volcanic activity occurred in the area. This took the form of intrusion of a number of dykes of basaltic rock which forced their way up through the sedimentary rocks. Due to the wetting and drying action of the weather the basaltic rock of the dykes has changed to clay.

From the end of the Triassic period to the middle of the Tertiary period, soft material was worn down or removed by wind and running water. In the final stages of this period of erosion the climate was apparently rather wetter and more humid than today's, causing the exposed rocks to change and form laterite soil, which is abundant in the Sutherland Shire.

=== River system ===
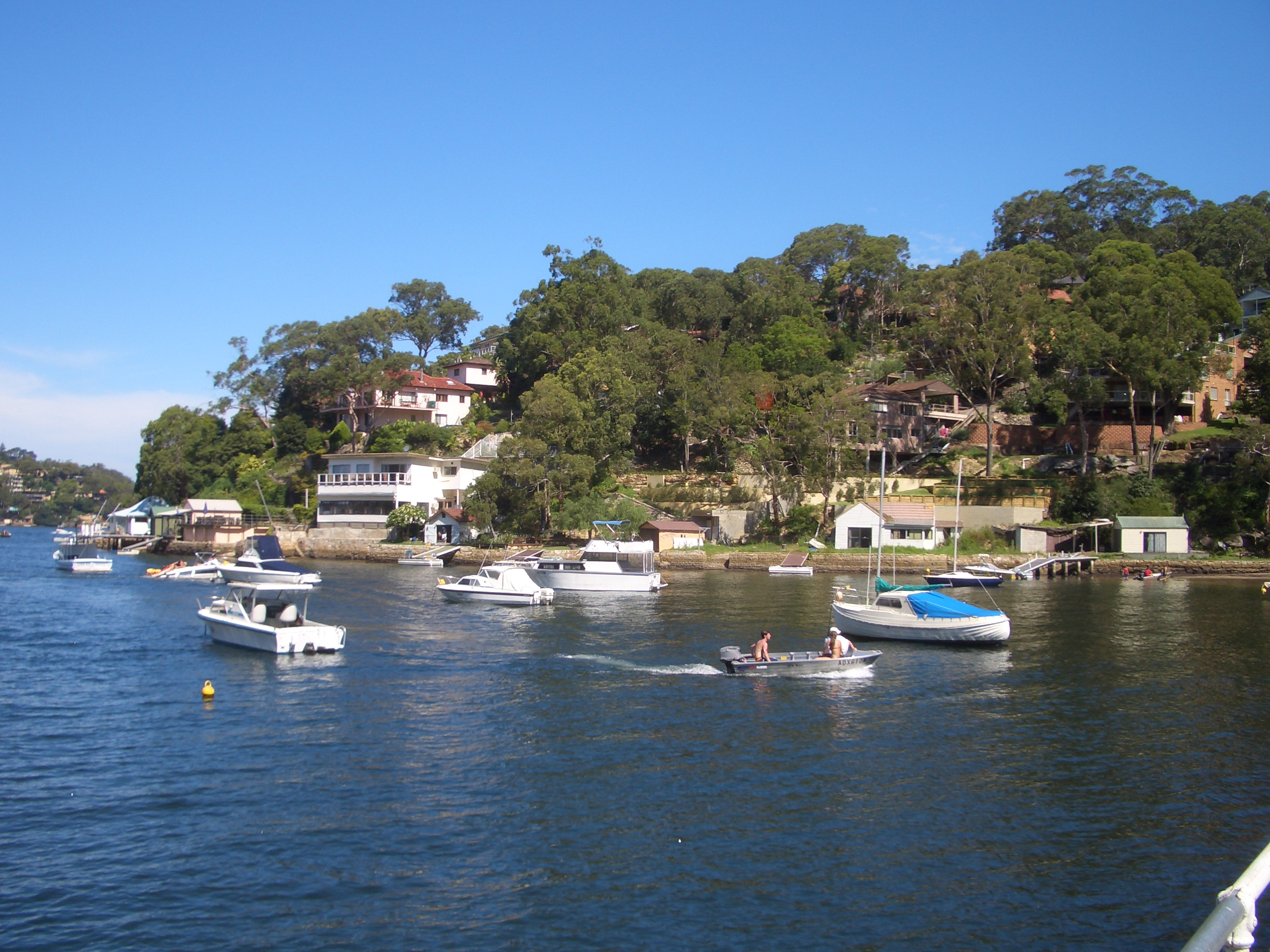
Gymea Bay

A little later in the Tertiary, tilting occurred south of the Georges River. The slow uplift, taking perhaps several million years, formed the present Woronora Plateau, a surface which rises gently in the south. This process caused the river system in the Shire to flow in steeper watercourses. They then became more active, carving the steep gorges of Woronora, Hacking, Georges Rivers and their tributaries which can be seen today. Waterfalls such as those at Waterfall and Undola also formed during this period. Water supplies within the shire are of two kinds. The main source is the surface supply provided by the Woronora Dam, which is built in the deep gorge of Woronora River. A second source exists in the form of underground water.

During the last ice age, the rivers had to do additional work cutting down through the rocks to reach the lower and more distant ocean, leading to the "valley-in-valley" shape of many of the deep gorges in the Sutherland Shire. When sea levels rose again, the silt and sand carried by the rivers gradually built up a considerable thickness of sediment. Sediment filled the area between Kurnell (then an island) and Miranda. Sand dunes began to accumulate in the Kurnell area and the mud and sand flats of Quibray and Gunnamatta Bays began to form. The Kurnell sand dunes have provided a cheap source of sand for the southern suburbs of Sydney but in the process of exploitation this area has been robbed of its character and the removal of vegetation has opened the way to erosion.

=== Royal National Park ===
The Premier John Robertson dedicated 18,000 acres (7,300 ha) to "The National Park" (now the Royal National Park), gazetted in 1879. This makes it the second oldest park of its kind in the world after Yellowstone National Park in America, although there is no public gazette record for Yellowstone until the 1880s, making a valid claim for The Royal National Park being the oldest in the world. In 1880 the Park was increased to 33,000 acres (13,000 ha). Today it is just under 44,000 acres (18,000 ha). The National Park was given the prefix "Royal" after Queen Elizabeth visited the park in 1954.

=== Urban structure ===
Sutherland Shire is now predominantly a residential area with commercial centres and minor industrial and rural areas. The commercial centres of the council are located in the suburbs of Sutherland, Miranda (home to Westfield Miranda), Cronulla, Caringbah, Menai and Engadine. Sutherland Shire's old mantra was:

- Sutherland: "The centre of business".
- Miranda: "The centre of shopping"
- Cronulla: "The centre of leisure"

The suburb of Kurnell, which includes the site of the first landing site of James Cook, was also the site of a former oil refinery. Nearby is Towra Point Nature Reserve, a wetland of international importance. Australia's first and only nuclear reactor facilities are in the suburb of Lucas Heights. The reactor, run by the Australian Nuclear Science and Technology Organisation (ANSTO) is not a power station but is used for the production of radiopharmaceuticals, for research and irradiation.

The isolated suburbs of Bundeena and Maianbar are situated on the southern shore of Port Hacking between the water and the Royal National Park. They are accessible by boat, including a regular ferry service from Cronulla to Bundeena operated by Cronulla & National Park Ferry Cruises or by road through the national park.

== Significant parks and reserves ==
- Botany Bay National Park
- Caravan Head Bushland Reserve
- Heathcote National Park
- Royal National Park
- Towra Point Nature Reserve
- Joseph Banks Native Plants Reserve, Kareela

== Transport ==
The Sutherland Shire is serviced by Transit Systems and U-Go Mobility bus services and Sydney Trains services on the Illawarra line. The Princes Highway is the major road passing through the Shire. Bangor Bypass, Heathcote Road and New Illawarra Road are other major roads.

== Facilities ==
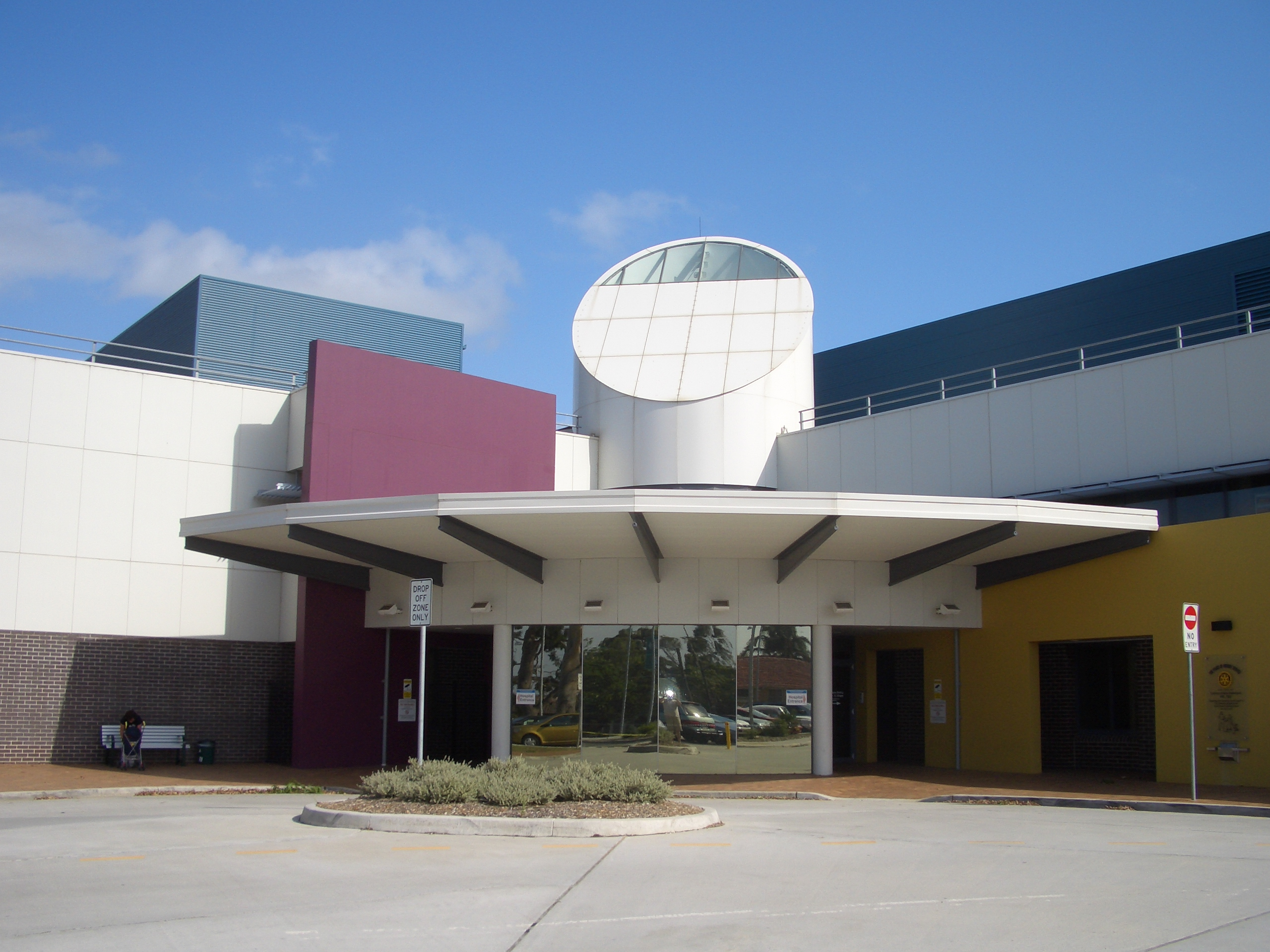
Sutherland Hospital

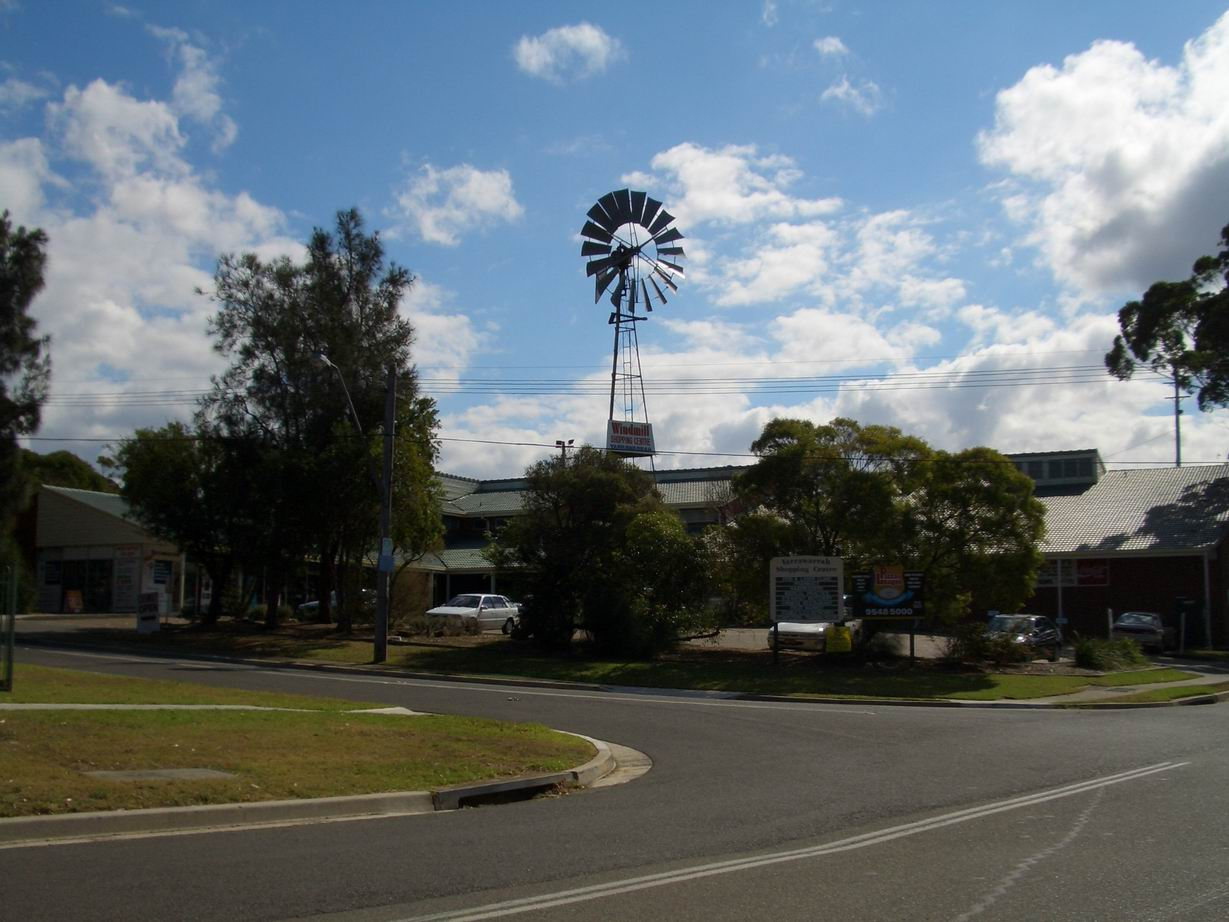
The Yarrawarrah windmill is a local landmark

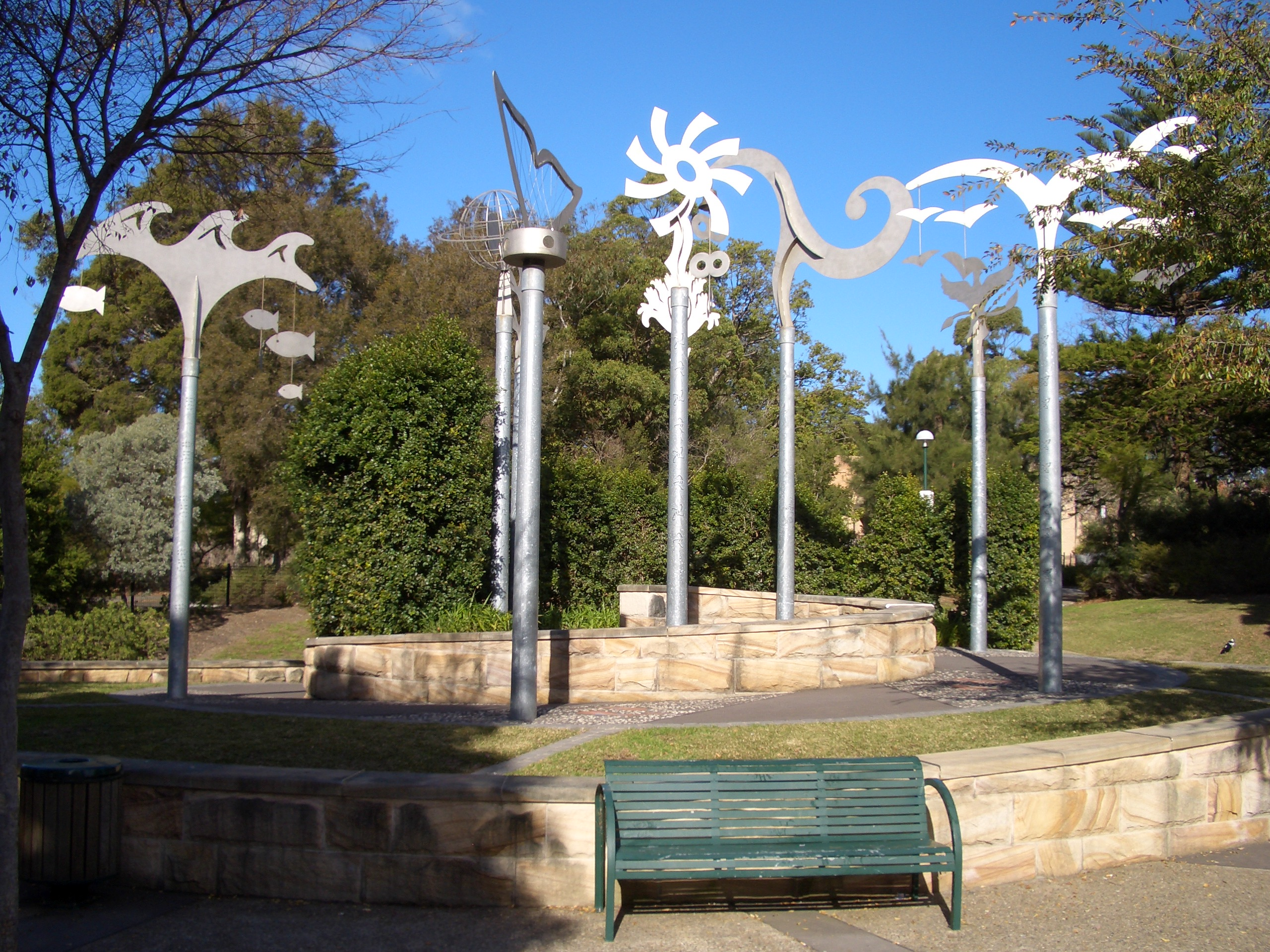
Peace Park in Sutherland

=== Education ===
There are now nearly 100 schools in the Sutherland Shire including the Gymea and Loftus Colleges of Technical and Further Education, a technology high school (Gymea Technology High School), one of the ten academically selective high schools in New South Wales (Caringbah High School), a sports oriented high school (Endeavour Sports High School), more than twenty secondary schools, preschool centres, and special schools provided to serve children with specific learning needs.

=== Health ===
The Sutherland Hospital and Kareena Private Hospital are both located at Caringbah and President Private Hospital is located in Kirrawee.

=== Emergency services ===
Fire and Rescue NSW has stations at Miranda, Sutherland, Cronulla, Engadine and Bundeena. The NSW Ambulance Service has stations at Caringbah (Sutherland Hospital), Engadine in the south and Menai in the west and Bundeena. Due to the large area designated as National Park and the prevalence of bushland in the area Sutherland Shire has 12 New South Wales Rural Fire Service stations. There are stations located at Bundeena, Engadine, Grays Point, Heathcote, Illawong, Kurnell, Loftus, Maianbar, Menai (currently relocating to Barden Ridge), Sandy Point, Waterfall and Woronora. These brigades attend fires, vehicle accidents, missing persons searches and community education days. Good coverage in the area from Fire and Rescue NSW also means that these Rural Fire Service members are regularly sent out of area to help the rest of New South Wales and on occasion interstate. The Sutherland Shire also has a State Emergency Service unit based at Heathcote with facilities at Menai and shared facilities at Woronora.

==== Surf life saving and river life saving ====
There are four surf life saving clubs, a surf life saving offshore rescue boat and Marine Rescue NSW base located at Cronulla and a river life saving club and Rural Fire Service and State Emergency Service boats located at Woronora. The clubs and boats provide life saving and first aid services to the many visitors to the Sutherland Shire's beaches and rivers. The four surf clubs from south to north are: Cronulla SLSC, North Cronulla SLSC, Elouera SLSC and Wanda SLSC. The offshore rescue boat operated by the Cronulla District Lifesaver Rescue frequently assists in major marine rescues along the Sydney coast.

== Culture ==
Anthony Redmond claims the Shire has a reputation for insular localism that also manifests itself in surf culture, has a high conservative vote and is Sydney's fourth largest Bible belt.

- The National Rugby League football club, the Cronulla-Sutherland Sharks are the major local professional sports team. They have an average attendance of 12,000-15,000.
- North Cronulla Surf Life Saving club doubled as a police station in the television series White Collar Blue.
- Southern Districts Rugby Club is the premier grade rugby union football club for the Sutherland Shire and are known as the "Rebels".
- The Sutherland Sharks Football Club is the Sutherland Shire's New South Wales Premier League 1 Team in soccer.
- Sutherland Shire Football Association is the largest Football Association in the Southern Hemisphere.
- The Cronulla-Sutherland District Rugby Football League is the second-largest local rugby league competition in Sydney.
- Four winners of the world's biggest triathlon, the Ironman World Championships in Kailua-Kona Hawaii, call the Sutherland Shire home. Cronulla Triathlon Club athletes Greg Welch (1994), Michellie Jones (2006), Chris McCormack (2007 & 2010) and Craig Alexander (2008, 2009 & 2011). A resident of the Sutherland Shire won the race, considered the world's toughest one day sporting event, for six years running (2006–2011).
- The 1979 novel, Puberty Blues by Gabrielle Carey and Kathy Lette, is a teen novel about the lives of two girls from the lower middle class of the Sutherland Shire.
- The 1981 film Puberty Blues and the 2012 TV series Puberty Blues are both based on the novel and predominantly filmed around the Sutherland Shire, including Cronulla Beach and the southern campus of Caringbah High School.
- The television reality shows Sylvania Waters and The Shire follow the lives of residents in the Sutherland Shire.

== Economy ==
According to a National Institute of Economic and Industry Research profile in 2016, the Gross Regional Product of the Sutherland Shire is estimated to be $9.74 billion, 1.9% of NSW's Gross State Product.

=== Retail ===
The biggest commercial areas in the Sutheland Shire are located at Miranda, Menai, Sylvania, Kirrawee, Caringbah and Cronulla. Miranda is the main retail and commercial centre of the Sutherland Shire, being home to Westfield Miranda along with Lederer Miranda and Kiora Centre as the two nearby smaller shopping centres.

Southgate is another major shopping complex, located in Sylvania. Cronulla is also a popular retail and commercial centre, with numerous restaurants and cafes and a considerable number of surf stores and other clothing and fashion shops.

Other neighbourhood shopping centres have also developed at Bangor, Illawong, Kareela, Jannali, Yarrawarrah and Menai together with a small centre at Alfords Point. Gymea Shopping Village attracts many people, with a regional arts centre, Hazelhurst Regional Gallery and Arts Centre, and a cafe and restaurant scene.

=== Nuclear science ===
Since 1956, Sutherland Shire has been home to ANSTO's Lucas Heights research campus, and the HIFAR, MOATA and OPAL nuclear reactors. In the past, ANSTO, then known as the AAEC, conducted scientific research into the nuclear fuel cycle, nuclear medicine, and methods for enriching uranium. It is believed that this was to support Australia's fledgling nuclear weapons program, which is thought to have lasted from the Menzies government in the 1950s until the election of the Whitlam government in the early 1970s.

== Sister cities ==
The Sutherland Shire maintains sister city relations with the following cities:

- Lakewood, Colorado, United States
- Chūō, Tokyo, Japan

There are also two informal relationships:

- Sutherland, Scotland, UK
- Bangor, Wales, UK

== See also ==
- Local government areas of New South Wales
- Bangor Bypass
- Botany Bay
- Cronulla riots
- Cronulla sand dunes
- Puberty Blues
- The Shire
