= Joseph Banks Native Plants Reserve =

Botanical garden in Sydney, Australia

Coordinates: 34°01′16″S 151°05′05″E

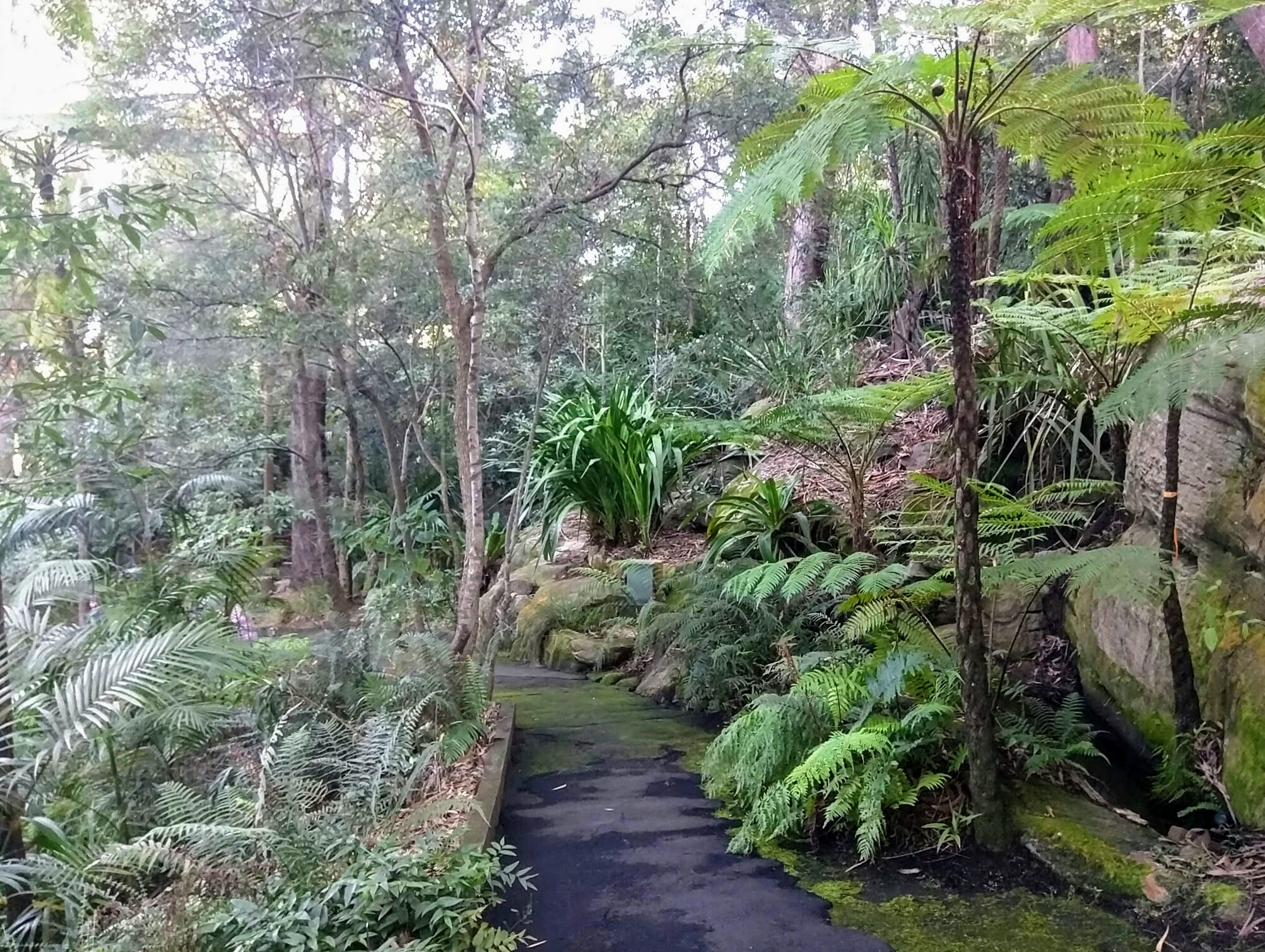
- Interactive map of Joseph Banks Native Plants Reserve
- Location: Kareela, New South Wales, Australia
- Area: 2.2 ha (0.022 km^{2})
- Open: 9 am - 5 pm

Joseph Banks Native Plants Reserve is one of the few specialised gardens in Sydney to focus entirely on Australian native plants. Located at Kareela in Sutherland Shire and established in 1970 as a tribute to Joseph Banks, the landscaped garden covers an area of 2.2 hectares, with 4 kilometres of sealed paths.

== Location ==
Joseph Banks Native Plants Reserve is located at Manooka Place, Kareela in Sutherland Shire, New South Wales, Australia. There is also a pedestrian entrance on Bates Drive, Kareela.

== History ==
The reserve was established in 1970 as a bicentenary project to commemorate the 200th anniversary of the arrival of James Cook in Botany Bay in April 1770. The reserve was named after Joseph Banks (1743-1820), naturalist and patron of the sciences, who accompanied Cook and collected many botanical specimens around Botany Bay including from the new Banksia genus.

== Flora ==
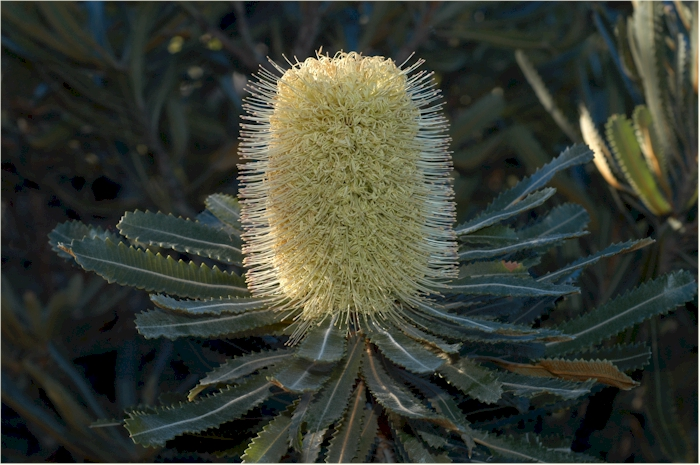
Banksia aemula

The reserve showcases a wide range of Australian native plants from around Australia in planted theme gardens including an acacia garden, sun-loving plants, rainforest, silver foliage garden, bush tucker, shade garden, fern garden and lily garden. The reserve also includes an unplanted natural area showing the original remnant Sydney sandstone vegetation. Over 600 plants are labelled with their botanical name.

The reserve includes most of the local east coast banksias including Banksia aemula, Banksia ericifolia, "Banksia integrifolia", Banksia marginata, "Banksia oblongifolia", Banksia paludosa, "Banksia plagiocarpa", Banksia robur, Banksia serrata and Banksia spinulosa. Western Australian species growing at the reserve include Banksia blechnifolia and Banksia repens.

== Management ==
The reserve is managed by Sutherland Shire Council with staff onsite Monday to Friday, with volunteer assistance from the Australian Plants Society, Sutherland Group. Volunteers undertake maintenance tasks such as weeding, pruning and planting.

== Access and facilities ==
The reserve is open 7 days a week, 9 am to 5 pm. Closed Good Friday and Christmas Day. Free entry. The reserve has paved paths, toilets, picnic tables and woodfired BBQs. Some paths are accessible and suitable for people with mobility impairments.

== See also ==
- Australian Native Plants Society
