= The Shire (TV series) =

2012 Australian reality TV series

- Genre: Drama; Reality
- Opening theme: "Dumb Things" by Paul Kelly
- Country of origin: Australia
- Original language: English
- No. of seasons: 1
- No. of episodes: 9

Production
- Producer: Shine Australia
- Running time: 23 minutes (without ads)
- Production companies: Network Ten; Shine Australia

Original release
- Network: Network Ten
- Release: 16 July – 10 September 2012

The Shire is an Australian reality-drama series that played on Network Ten in Australia and Hulu in the United States. It debuted on Ten on 16 July 2012. The series followed the lives of 15 people, that work, live or play in and around Sydney's Sutherland Shire. The series has been described as "dramality" by Ten, a combination of drama with prompting and light scripting. The Shire was created and produced by Shine Australia. Modelled on the American TV show The Hills, the production company describe the series as a reality show version of soap opera Home and Away. The final episode was shown on Monday 10 September 2012.

== Cast ==
- Simon, radio announcer, Mitch's friend
- Gabrielle, direct sales assistant, Mitch's girlfriend
- Michelle, Mitch's mum
- Sophie, ultrasound cavitation manager
- Vernesa, shop assistant
- Kerry, bar/beauty salon manager
- Tegan, singing teacher and waitress
- Matt, recruitment consultant, Kerry's boyfriend
- Folksy, Spock's friend
- Becka, student
- Tony, financier, Beckaa's father
- Kris and Stace, Beckaa's best friends
- Joel "Rif-Raf", rapper
- Megan, stripper
- Nikee, pole dancer
- Michael, bricklayer, Nickee's manager
- Michelka, personal assistant

== Reception ==
The first episode of The Shire received a mixed response. TV blogger Steven Molk wrote "As a first episode, The Shire ticked all the boxes. It established the characters well (in that we all know what to expect from them in future episodes), set out the premise of the show quickly and offered tidbits of insight into the relationships between the key players." Pedestrian TV's review was favourable noting, "While Sophie and Vernesa are frontrunners as my early favourites, I was also quite taken with the character Rif-Raf... Reality television is a genre that shouldn't be confused with documentary television... I think The Shire is just great."

John Birmingham of the Brisbane Times also gave a favourable review, "Lest you judge me, before I have a chance to get judgey, just let me say I loved this TV train wreck. I loved it like a diabetic loves that last, choc-dipped fudge brownie that sends him hurtling towards surgery for the emergency amputation of his gangrenous toes." A less favourable review was given by Michael Idato of The Sydney Morning Herald, "Does Ten have a hit on its hands? The answer is nearly, but not quite. It needs to be doing modest business on the good side of the million-viewer watermark for that. But it's a noisy nearly-hit, and in a room where everyone's talking, silence is death. The fact that most people will kick the show doesn't mean much; the "reality" genre is engineered to create conversation, not adoration. And a hater, in commercial terms, is probably worth one and a half genuine fans."

According to the official OzTAM ratings data the premiere episode of The Shire received 941,000 (1.01M with +7 data) viewers while the second episode grew to 1.06M. The total viewers for the third episode decreased due to the scheduling of the London Olympic Games however the series consistently maintained healthy ratings throughout its run.

The show has also been sold internationally and is currently available on the US online platform Hulu.

== Controversy ==
The pilot episode generated significant controversy in Australian media and has been described as "edgy" and "offensive". Following a clip leaked in March 2012, local residents were angry that the area and residents would be portrayed negatively. The Mayor of Sutherland Shire Carol Provan vowed to take "any means possible" to stop the production crews filming in the area. The local council reportedly put forward a motion at a council meeting on 19 March saying they did "not approve the filming of The Shire and [would] not co-operate in any way with the production". The mayor urged locals not to cooperate with the makers of the program. Network Ten defied critics and pushed ahead with production. Controversy also arose after it was revealed that several of the stars were not actually Shire natives.
