= Shire Watch Independents =

- Abbreviation: SWI; Shire Watch
- Founders: John Levett and 5 others
- Founded: 1999
- Dissolved: 10 August 2016
- Ideology: Anti-overdevelopment
- Political position: Centre-left
- Sutherland Shire Council: 5 / 15 (2008−2011)

Shire Watch Independents (SWI), also known simply as Shire Watch, was an Australian political party that contested local government elections for Sutherland Shire in New South Wales.

The party was in an alliance with the Labor Party from 1999 until 2004, and again from 2008 until 2011.

== History ==
Shire Watch was founded by a group of six residents ahead of the 1999 local government elections. At the election on 11 September, the party won four seats, which was enough to defeat the incumbent Liberal Party majority and form an alliance with Labor. Shire Watch councillor Tracie Sonda served as mayor from 2000 until 2002.

In 2004, the Liberal Party won seven seats while Shire Watch won four.

At the 2008 election, the Liberal Party did not formally endorse candidates. Four Independent Liberals were elected, however the Shire Watch−Labor alliance won a majority, with five candidates from Shire Watch and three from Labor elected. Shire Watch councillor Lorraine Kelly was elected by councillors as mayor following the elections, and remained in the role until 2010.

In 2011, the Shire Watch−Labor alliance broke down after Shire Watch councillor Carol Provan left the party and allied with the Independent Liberals, who assisted in electing her mayor.

At the 2012 election, Shire Watch lost four of its seats, and Peter Towell was the only member of the party re-elected.

On 10 August 2016, Towell announced he would contest the 2016 election as an independent candidate, thus dissolving Shire Watch.
