= Kirrawee High School =

Coordinates: 34°02′36″S 151°04′27″E

- Kirrawee, New South Wales; Australia

Information
- Type: Co-educational public high school
- Motto: Measure by Achievement
- Established: 1966
- Principal: Christine Campbell
- Grades: 7–12
- Enrolment: 1250
- Colours: Navy, grey and white
- Website: https://kirrawee-h.schools.nsw.gov.au/

Kirrawee High School is a comprehensive co-educational high school located in Kirrawee, a suburb of Sydney, Australia.

The school was opened in 1966 and now caters for around 1,200 students, most continuing their education from three local primary schools, Gymea Bay, Grays Point and Kirrawee. The school is a Languages High School which also offers a comprehensive education in sports and in the performing arts, with musician James Morrison, who plays a concert at the school every year, a close mentor for the school's Jazz Orchestra.

In the Sutherland Cronulla Education District, Kirrawee High School was second only to the academic selective high school Caringbah High School. Kirrawee High School is also has produced the highest number of Olympic gold medallists in this district.

Extra-curricular activities offered include debating and public speaking, musical and dramatic productions, the Student Council, community service, charitable collections and fund raising and many sports programs. Brett McKay, the head science teacher, has been awarded the Prime Minister's Prize for Excellence in Science Teaching.

== See also ==
- List of government schools in New South Wales: G–P
- Education in Australia
- List of high schools producing multiple Olympic gold medalists

== Notable alumni ==
- Larissa Behrendt – Indigenous academic, lawyer and writer. NSW Australian of the Year 2011
- Alicia McCormack – Olympic bronze medalist, Beijing 2008 water polo and London 2012 water polo
- Chris McCormack – twice World Ironman Triathlon champion
- Emma Pask – jazz vocalist
- Kirsten Thomson – Olympic silver medalist, Sydney 2000 swimming
- Nathan Walker – Professional ice hockey player, Stanley Cup winner
- Nicola Zagame – Olympic bronze medalist, London 2012 water polo
- Saya Sakakibara - Olympic gold medalist, Paris 2024 BMX
- Ashlee Ankudinoff - Olympic gold medalist, Paris 2024 cycling
- Michael Dickson (American football) - American football punter and Holder for the Seattle Seahawks of the National Football League (NFL), Pro Bowler (2018) and Super Bowl LX Champion.
