= Woronora Dam, New South Wales =

Coordinates: 34°07′S 150°56′E

Woronora Dam Sydney, New South Wales
- Population: 0 (2021 census)
- Postcode(s): 2508
- LGA(s): City of Wollongong; City of Campbelltown; Sutherland Shire
- State electorate(s): Heathcote
- Federal division(s): Cunningham
Suburbs around Woronora Dam:
Holsworthy	Holsworthy	Heathcote
Holsworthy	Woronora Dam	Waterfall
Darkes Forest	Stanwell Tops	Helensburgh

Woronora Dam is a locality split between City of Wollongong, City of Campbelltown, and Sutherland Shire in New South Wales, Australia. In the 2016 census, Woronora Dam had a population of 3 people.

== Geography ==
The dam of the same name is located within the locality as is Lake Woronora, the reservoir created by the dam.
