= Kareela =

- Suburb
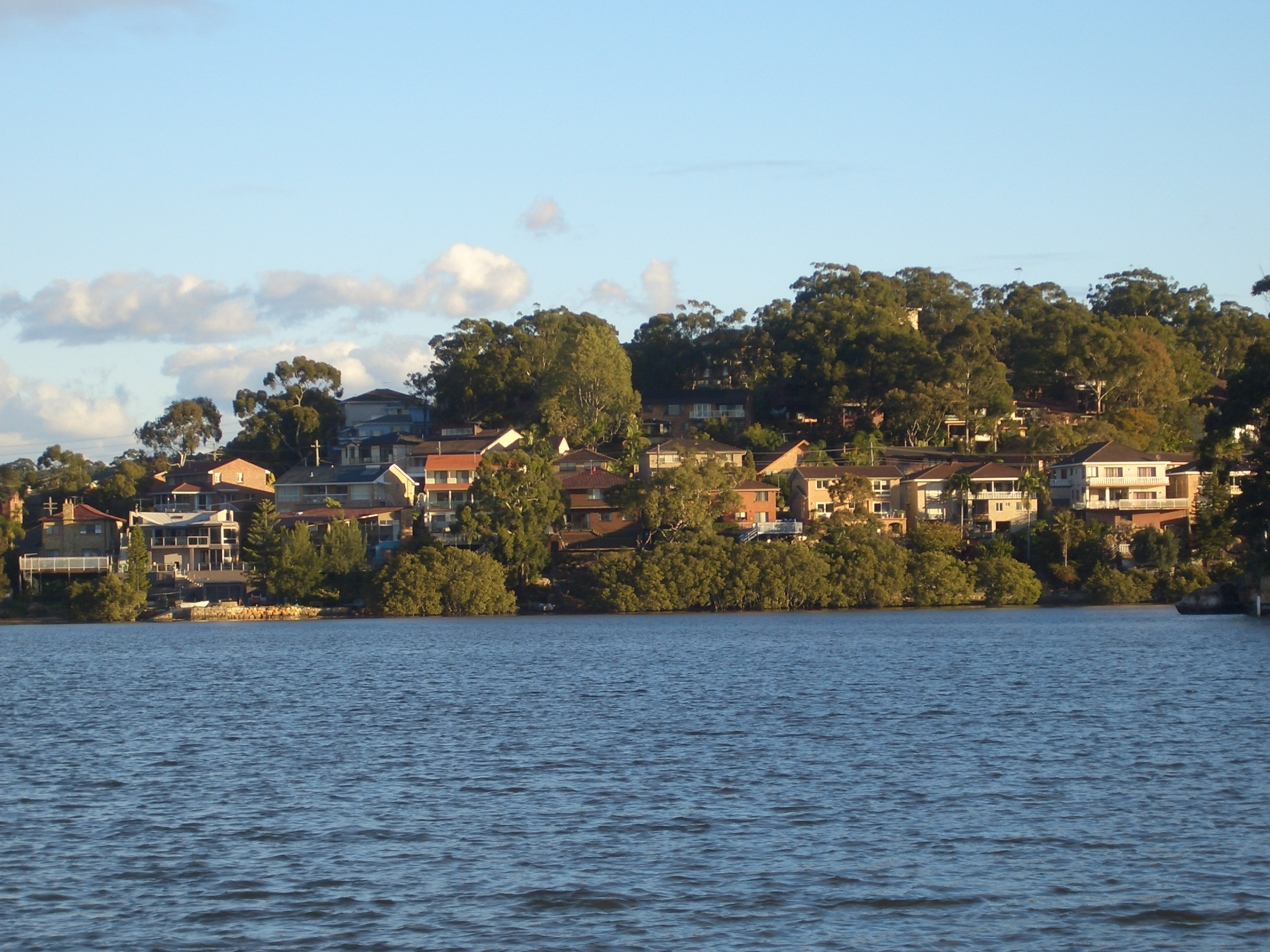
- View from Oyster Bay

- Interactive map of Kareela
- Coordinates: 34°00′54″S 151°04′50″E
- Country: Australia
- State: New South Wales
- City: Sydney
- LGA: Sutherland Shire
- Location: 24 km (15 mi) south of Sydney CBD
- Established: 1953

Government
  - State electorate: Miranda
  - Federal division: Cook
- Elevation: 44 m (144 ft)

Population
  - Total: 3,572 (2021 census)
- Postcode: 2232
Suburbs around Kareela
Como	Oyster Bay	Kangaroo Point
Jannali	Kareela	Sylvania
Kirrawee	Gymea	Miranda

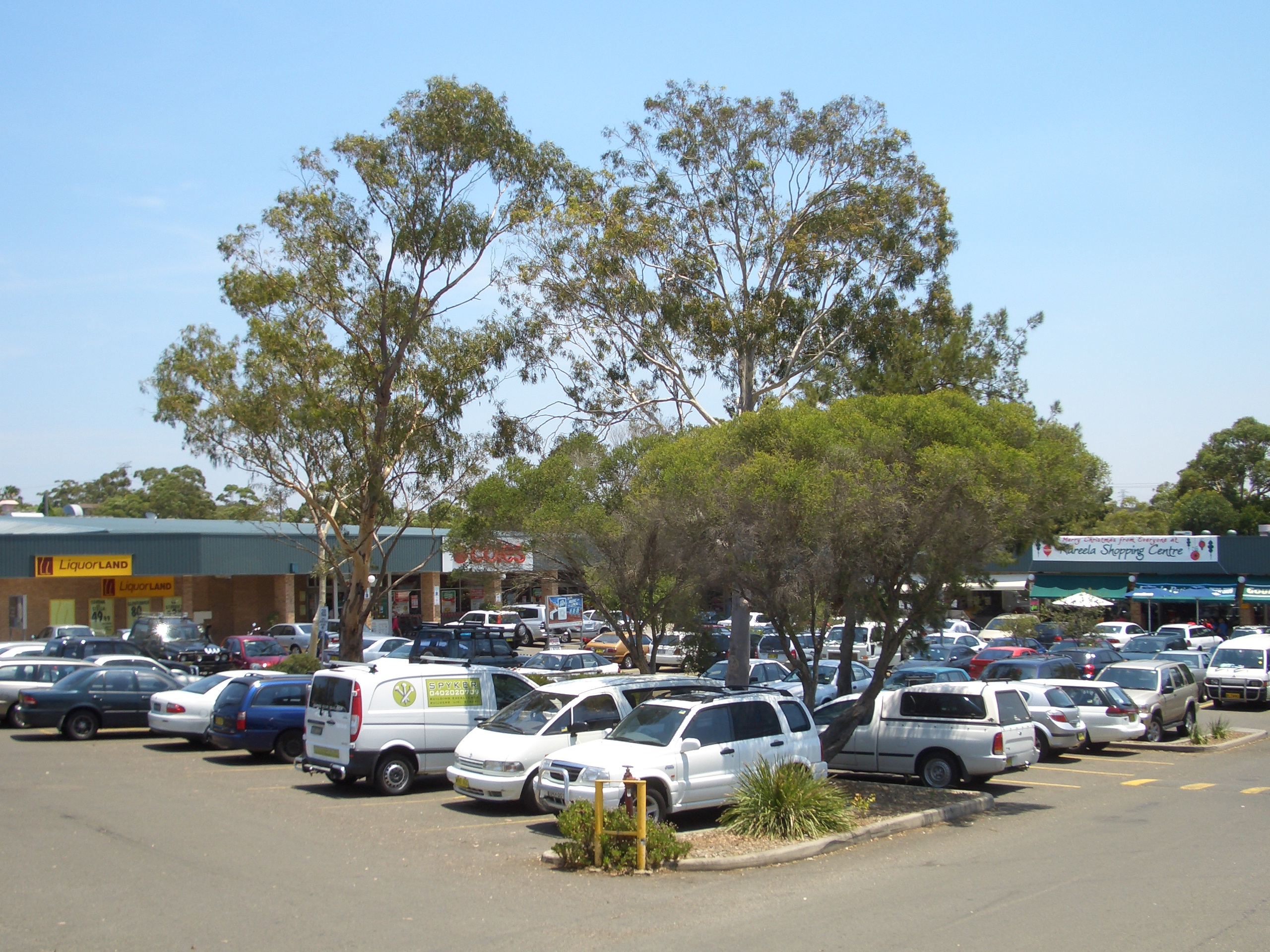
Kareela Shopping Centre

Kareela is a suburb in southern Sydney, in the state of New South Wales, Australia.

== History ==
Kareela was the first mixed-use estate developed by Stockland, developed in 1953. The estate was originally called Sylvan Headland. Sylvan Headland changed to Kareela after the estate opened. Kareela is derived from an Aboriginal word meaning 'place of trees and water' or alternatively 'south wind' or 'wind rider'. The name for the suburb was approved by the Geographical Names Board in 1968. Most of the streets in Kareela are named after outright winners and line-honours winners of the Sydney to Hobart Yacht Race between 1945 and 1970. In 1976, a co-educational, government primary school was opened. It is called Kareela Public School.

== Commercial area ==
Kareela had a small shopping centre, which as of 2013, has undergone major redevelopments. Formerly Kareela Shopping Centre; Kareela Village is a 14 million dollar project which was completed in 2015. The redevelopment includes the addition of specialty shops such as travel agent, medical centre, cafes, fashion shops, restaurants, fruitier, beauty & hair salons plus an early childhood learning centre and homewares as well as above and underground parking. Coles is the supermarket.

== Population ==
According to the 2021 census, there were 3,572 residents in Kareela. 75.1% of people were born in Australia. The next most common countries of birth were China 3.8% and England 3.8%. 79.1% of people spoke only English at home. Other languages spoken at home included Mandarin 4.3% and Greek 2.4%. The most common responses for religion were No Religion 32.3%, Catholic 27.5%, Anglican 17.7% and Eastern Orthodox 7.0%.
