= National Institute of Economic and Industry Research =

The National Institute of Economic and Industry Research (NIEIR), also known as National Economics, was founded in 1984 as a private economic research and consulting group serving clients in the public and private sectors. NIEIR is based in Melbourne.

NIEIR prepares economic studies and forecasts in a range of areas including industry policy and strategy, regional economics and local government, energy policy and forecasting, international trade, employment and training, infrastructure and major events analysis.
