= Gymea Technology High School =

Location
- Gymea, New South Wales; Australia; 34°1′47″S 151°4′57″E

Information
- Type: Public, comprehensive, secondary, co-educational, day school
- Motto: Inspire. Learn. Succeed.
- Established: 1963
- Principal: Peter Marsh
- Enrolment: ~650
- Campus type: Suburban
- Colours: Red, green, black, white
- Website: gymea-h.schools.nsw.gov.au

Gymea Technology High School (abbreviated as GTHS) is a technology-oriented, public and co-educational high school, located on the Princes Highway in the suburb of Gymea, in the Sutherland Shire, Sydney, New South Wales, Australia, next to Gymea TAFE. The school was opened in 1963 and has been a technology-oriented secondary school since it first opened.

Gymea Technology High School continues to achieve high marks in the NSW Higher School Certificate (HSC) with the school ranked in the top 27% in NSW Public Schools in the 2024 HSC.. It has been recognised as a school in technology by the New South Wales Department of Education and Apple Inc.

== School site ==
More than half the area of the school site is devoted to playing fields and tennis courts as well as other outdoor areas for use by students. A school canteen is provided for students to use before school, during recess and at lunch.

Renovations in 2007 saw the surface of the quadrangle resurfaced and other facilities improved, with shaded areas for students to sit during the summer months and open areas for ball games such as handball as well as soccer, football, and basketball. In 2010, the remodelling and updating of all science labs were completed and in 2011 a modern commercial-grade kitchen was installed for hospitality students. In 2016, the school finished a revamp of their technology facilities, combining the previously scattered computer labs into one central location. In 2022, the school implemented table tennis courts for sports students and recreational use.

== Incidents ==
In 2017, two students were admitted to the hospital after drug incidents at Gymea Technology High School involving ADHD medications. The two students were only admitted a few weeks from each other; the first occurring on 17 February, and the second occurring on 2 March. A parent was seeking answers for the school's alleged failure to follow standard procedure, neglecting police involvement, which was denied by the NSW Department of Education on behalf of the school.

== See also ==
- List of government schools in New South Wales: G–P
- Education in Australia
