= Maianbar =

- Suburb
- Aerial image of Maianbar looking to the North.

- Interactive map of Maianbar
- Country: Australia
- State: New South Wales
- City: Sydney
- LGA: Sutherland Shire
- Location: 29 km (18 mi) south of Sydney CBD

Government
  - State electorate: Heathcote
  - Federal division: Hughes

Area
  - Total: 0.29 km^{2} (0.11 sq mi)
- Elevation: 40 m (130 ft)

Population
  - Total: 539 (2021 census)
  - Density: 1,860/km^{2} (4,810/sq mi)
- Postcode: 2230
Suburbs around Maianbar
Lilli Pilli	Port Hacking	Burraneer
Warumbul	Maianbar	Cronulla
	Royal National Park	Bundeena

Maianbar is a village on the outskirts of southern Sydney, in the state of New South Wales, Australia 29 kilometres south of the Sydney central business district. It is part of the Sutherland Shire.

Maianbar is adjacent to the village of Bundeena, less than kilometre away and linked by a bush track, and footbridge. It lies on the southern side of Port Hacking, opposite the suburbs of Burraneer, Dolans Bay, Port Hacking, Lilli Pilli and Cronulla. Maianbar is surrounded by the Royal National Park.

== Name ==
Maianbar means deep tank or waterhole in the Gamilaraay language. The name initially referred to the site of local marine fish hatcheries and was probably chosen by the Trustees of the Royal National Park. Areas of today's suburb were known as Fishermans Bay Estate and Sand Spit Estate until 1951, when Sutherland Shire Council officially named it Maianbar.

== Population ==
In the 2021 Census, there were 539 people in Maianbar. 77.7% of people were born in Australia and 90.0% of people spoke only English at home. The most common responses for religion were No Religion 50.6% and Catholic 20.2%.

== Commercial area ==
There is a single shop in Maianbar which sells a small variety of goods. There is also a small community hall, Rural Fire Brigade station and local park.

== Transport ==
Maianbar is quite an isolated village but can be accessed by road - a twenty-five-minute drive from Sutherland, or by ferry. There is an hourly commuter ferry service from Cronulla to Bundeena. Cabbage Tree Creek and 'The Basin' separate Bundeena from Maianbar. A bush track and footbridge link the two villages, which is approx 30mins walk. There is a road link between Bundeena and Maianbar, approx 9 km.

Maianbar Bundeena Bus Service operates bus route 989 for local bus services between Maianbar and Bundeena on school days only. In addition there is one return trip every Wednesday to Engadine and one return trip every Friday to Miranda both from Bundeena via Maianbar.

== Art Trail ==
There are many artists in both Bundeena and Maianbar. The residents host a monthly art exhibition in local artists' houses, called the Art Trail. The Art Trail is held on the first Sunday of every month. Art Trail Website The Art Trail is free of charge and provides local artists with an opportunity to sell their artwork.

== Environment ==
During early colonial settlement, Indonesian rusa deer were introduced and have since become a large population in the area. Many residents see the deer as pests, the National Parks & Wildlife Service and Council are permitted to cull. However many residents also take delight in the deer, which causes much division and emotion in the affected townships.

== Gallery ==
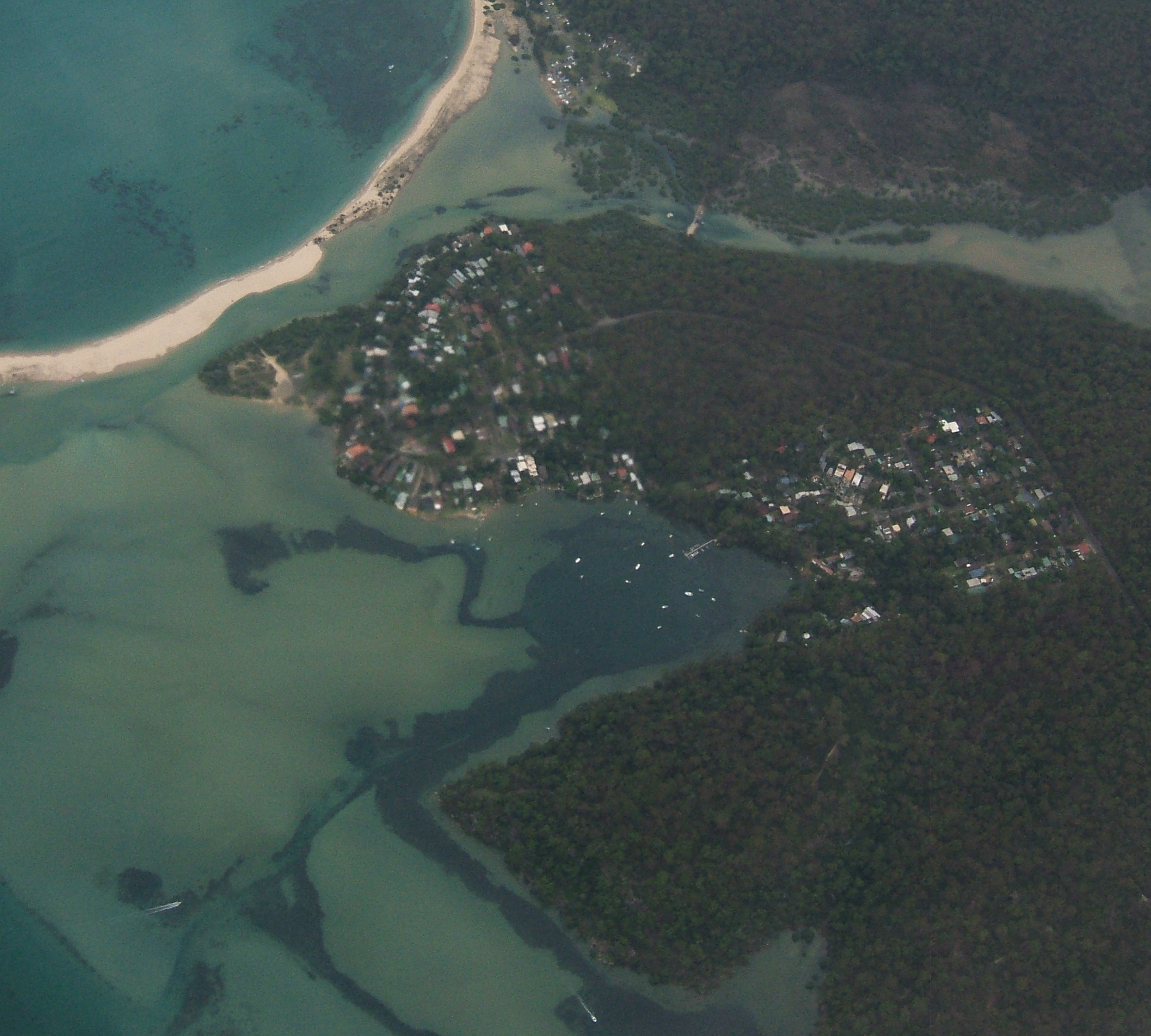
Aerial view of Yenabilli, Maianbar and Bundeena

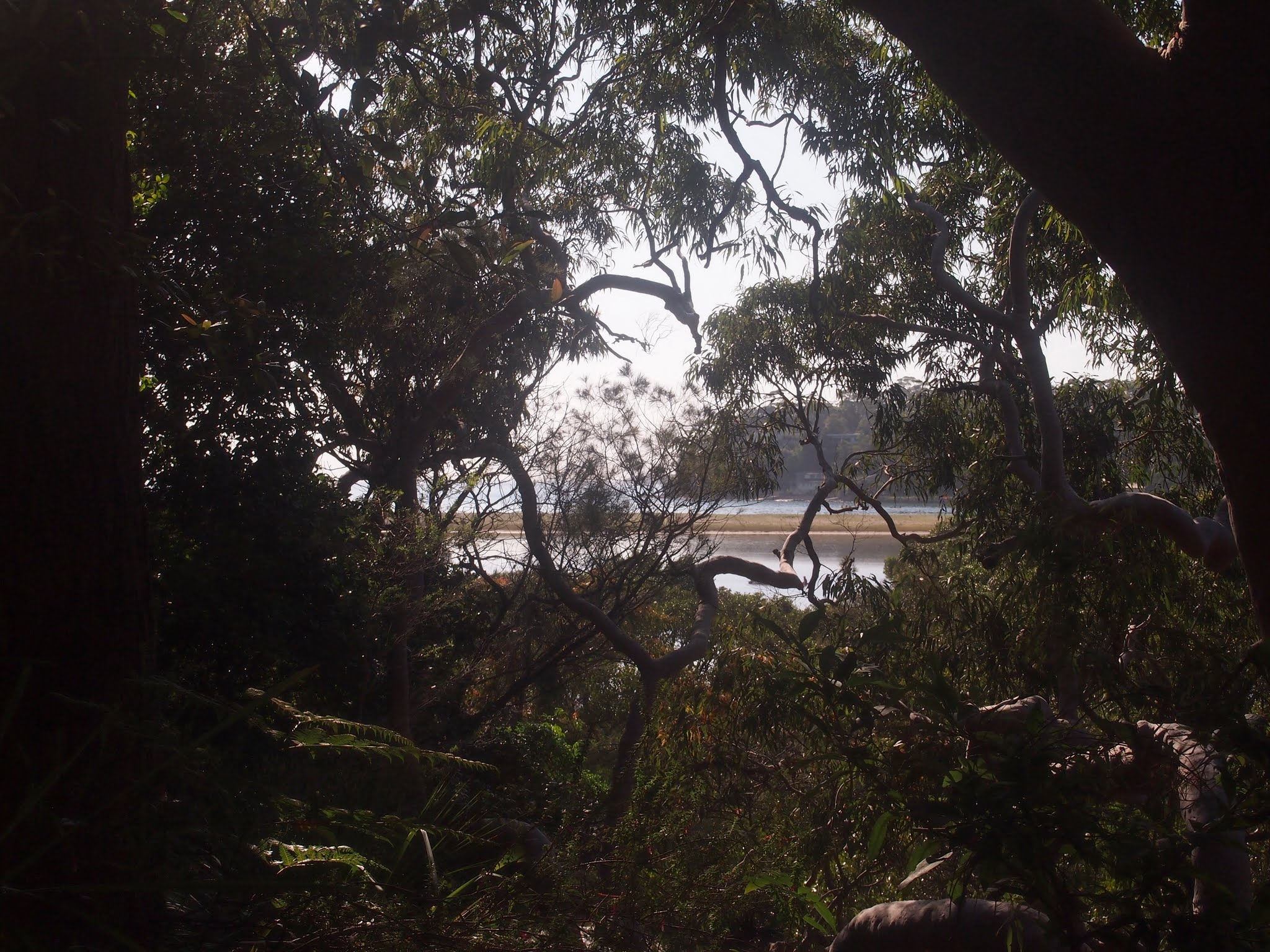
Maianbar NSW 2230, Australia – Panorama #1

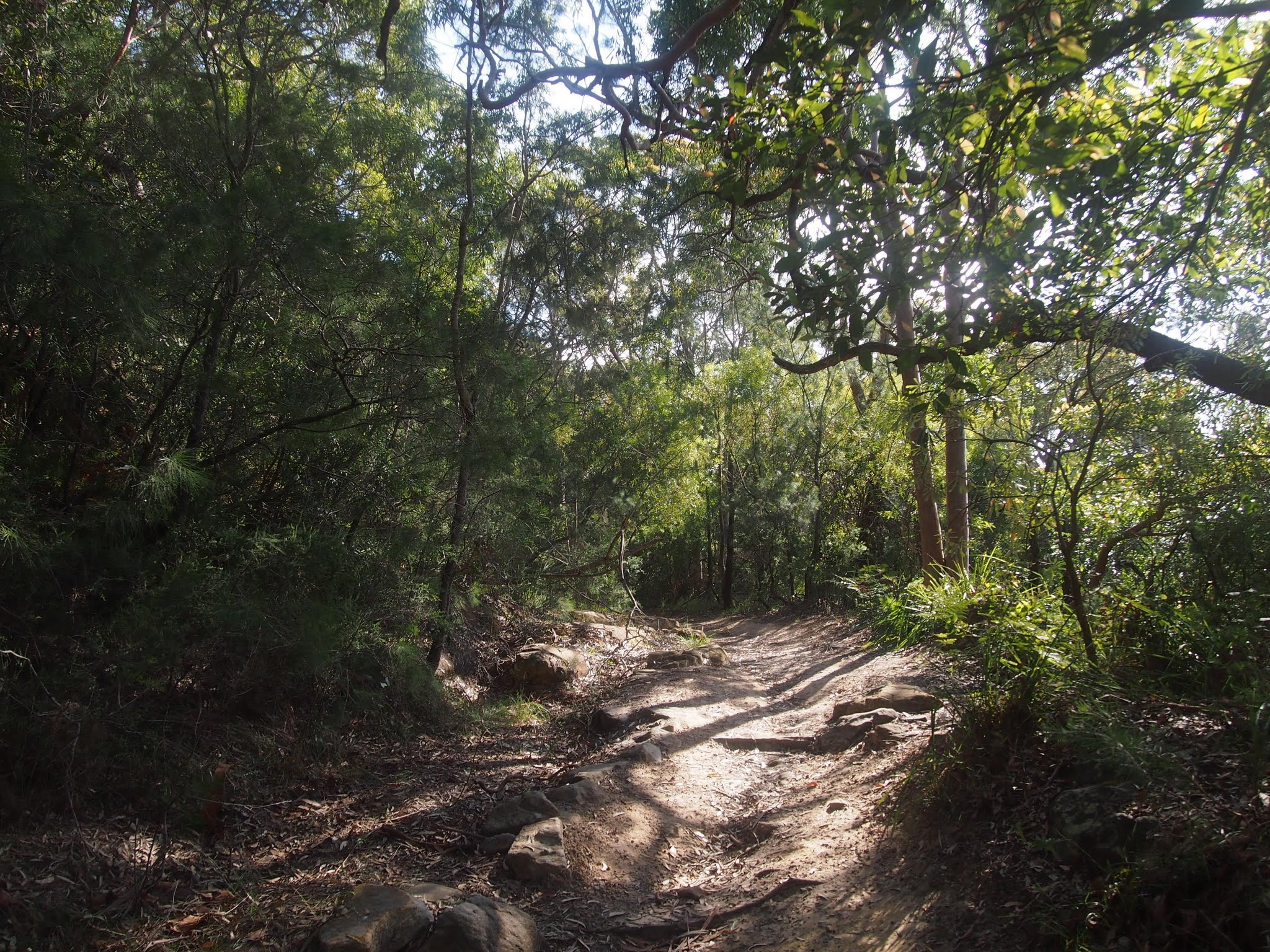
Maianbar NSW 2230, Australia – Panorama #2

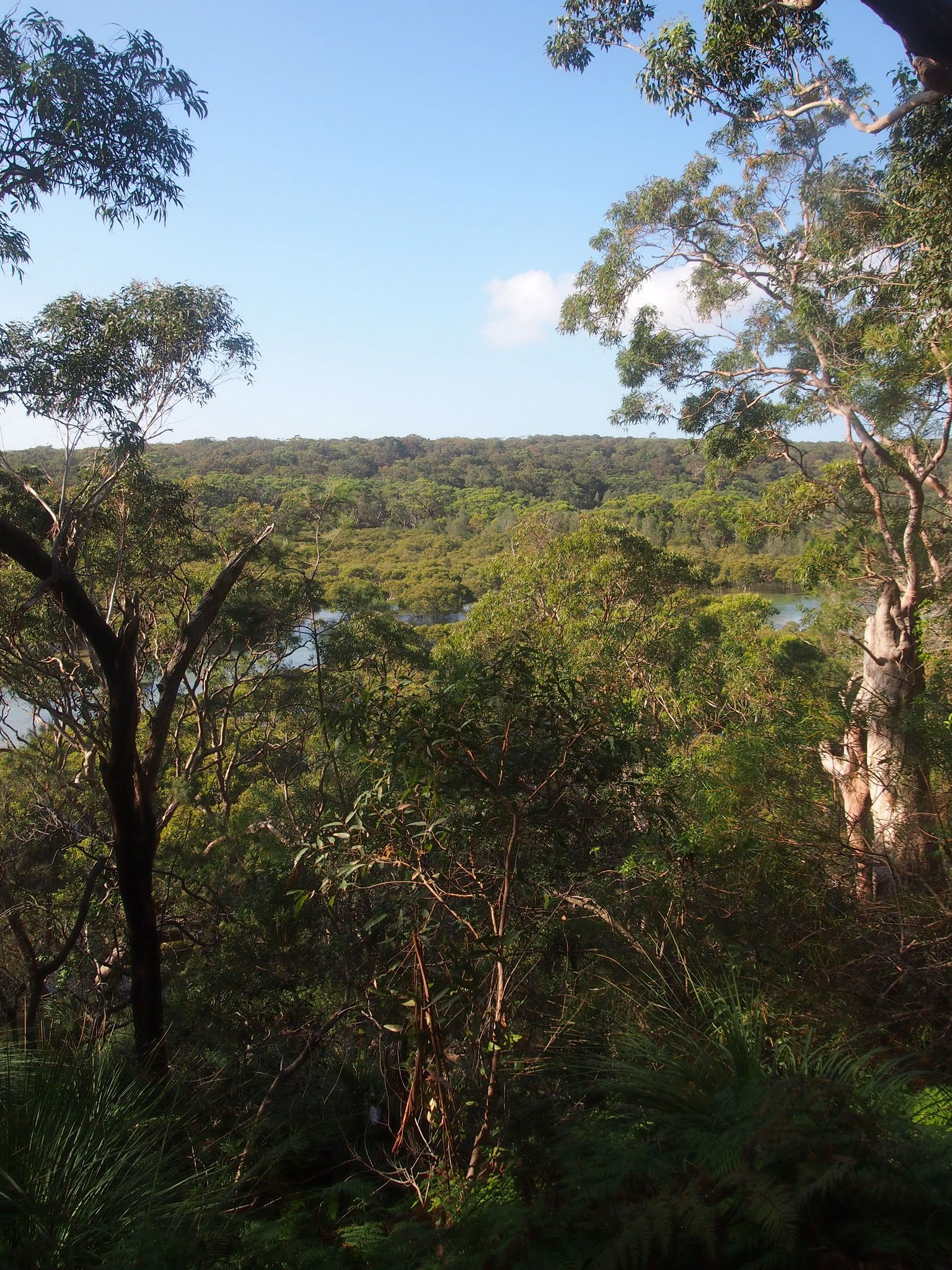
Maianbar NSW 2230, Australia – Panorama #3

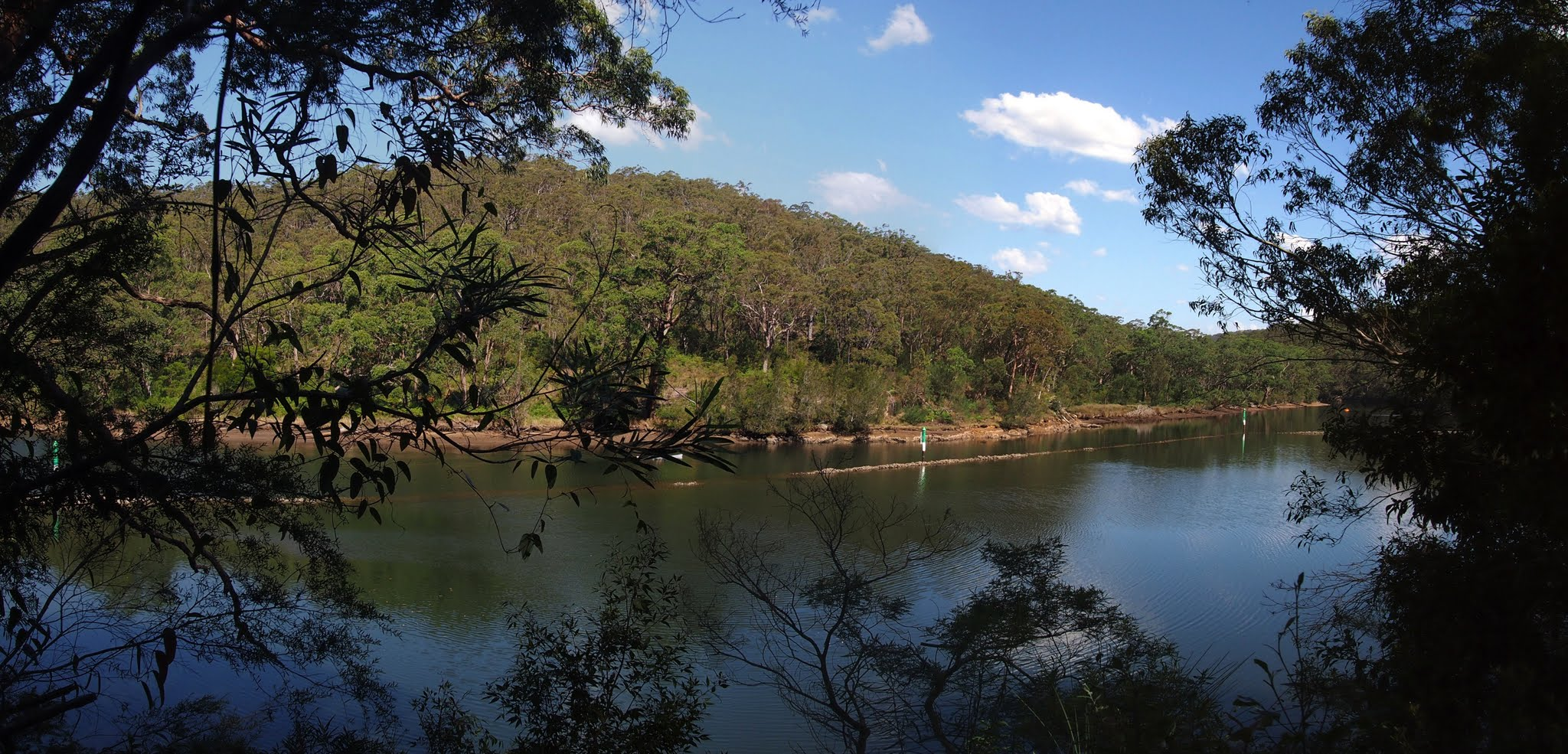
Riverside Drive (#1)

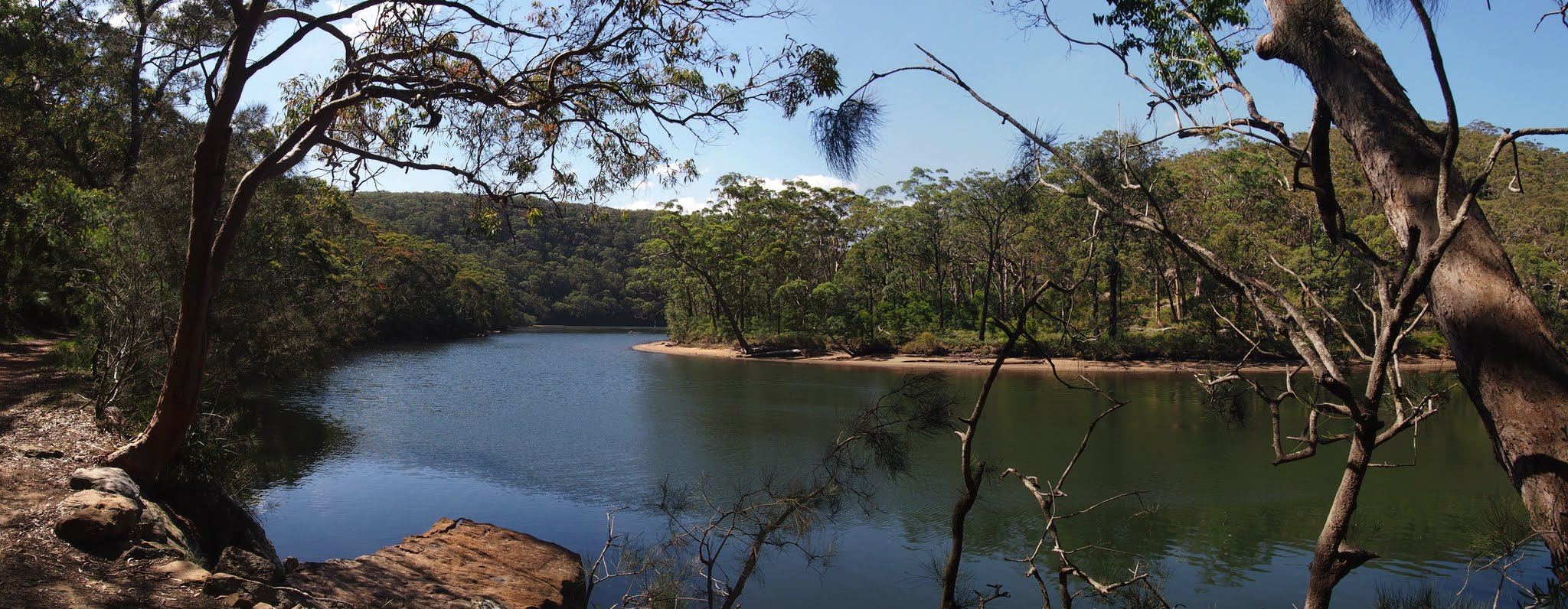
Riverside Drive (#2)

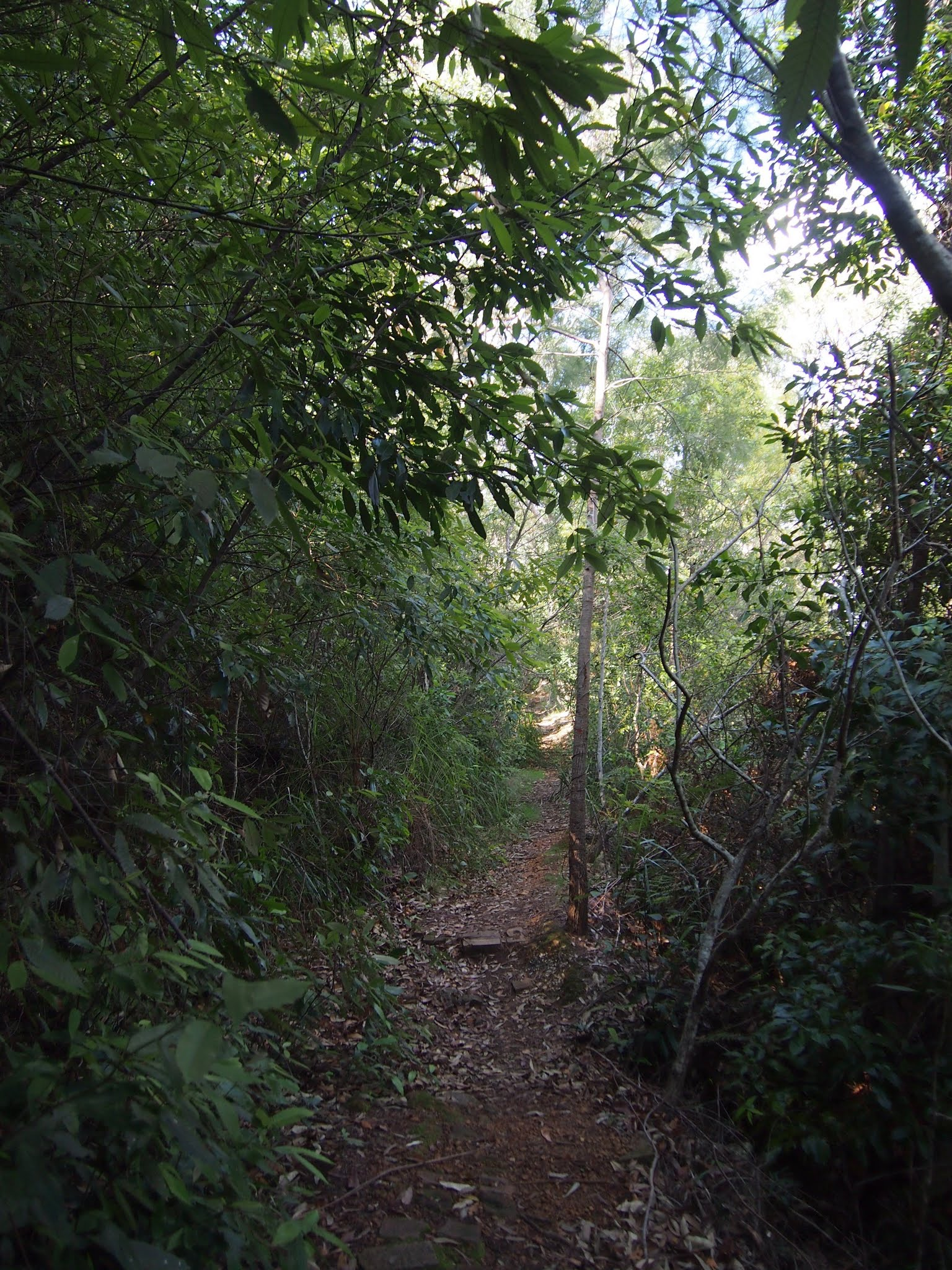
Riverside Drive (#3)

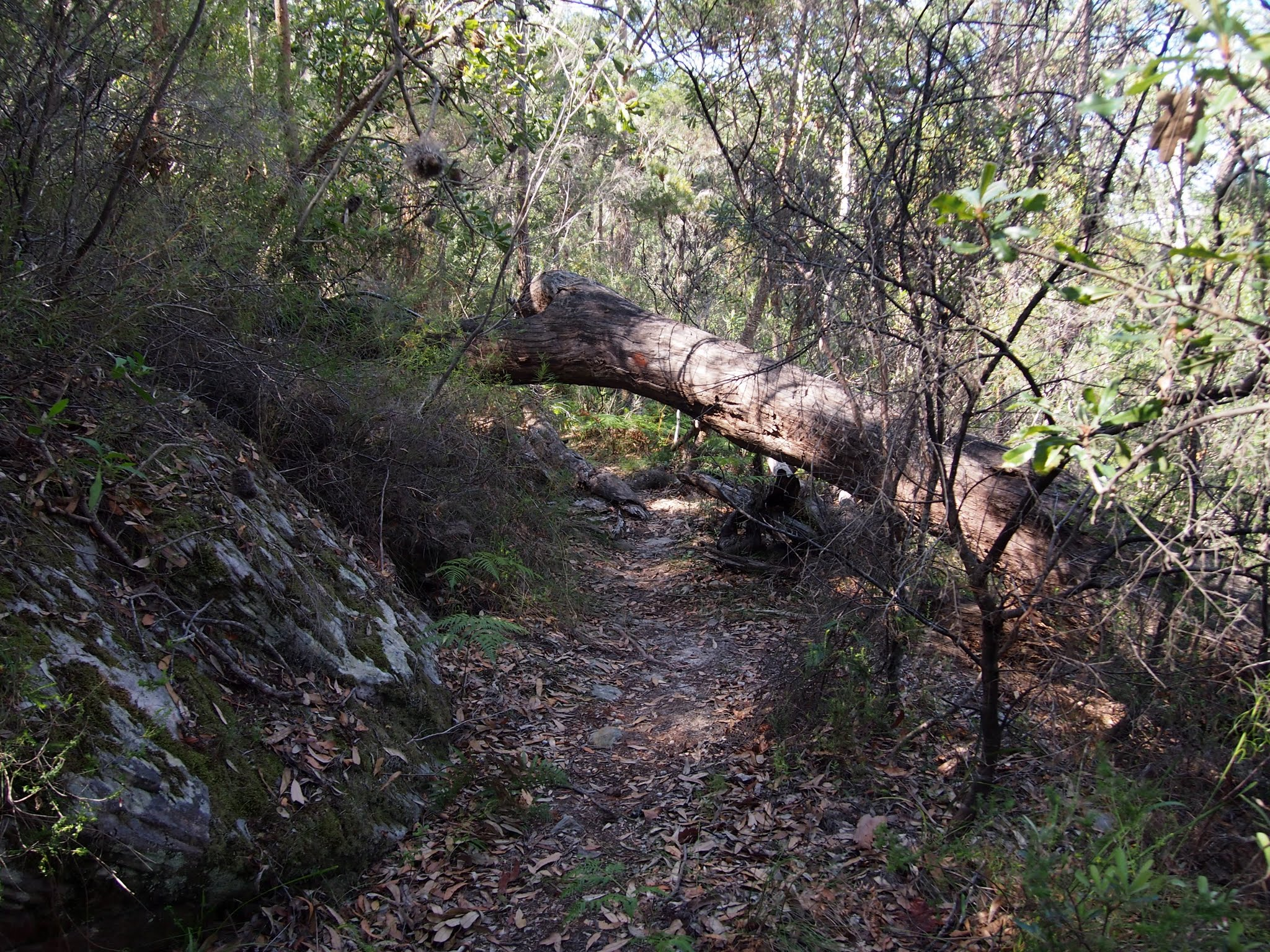
Riverside Drive (#4)

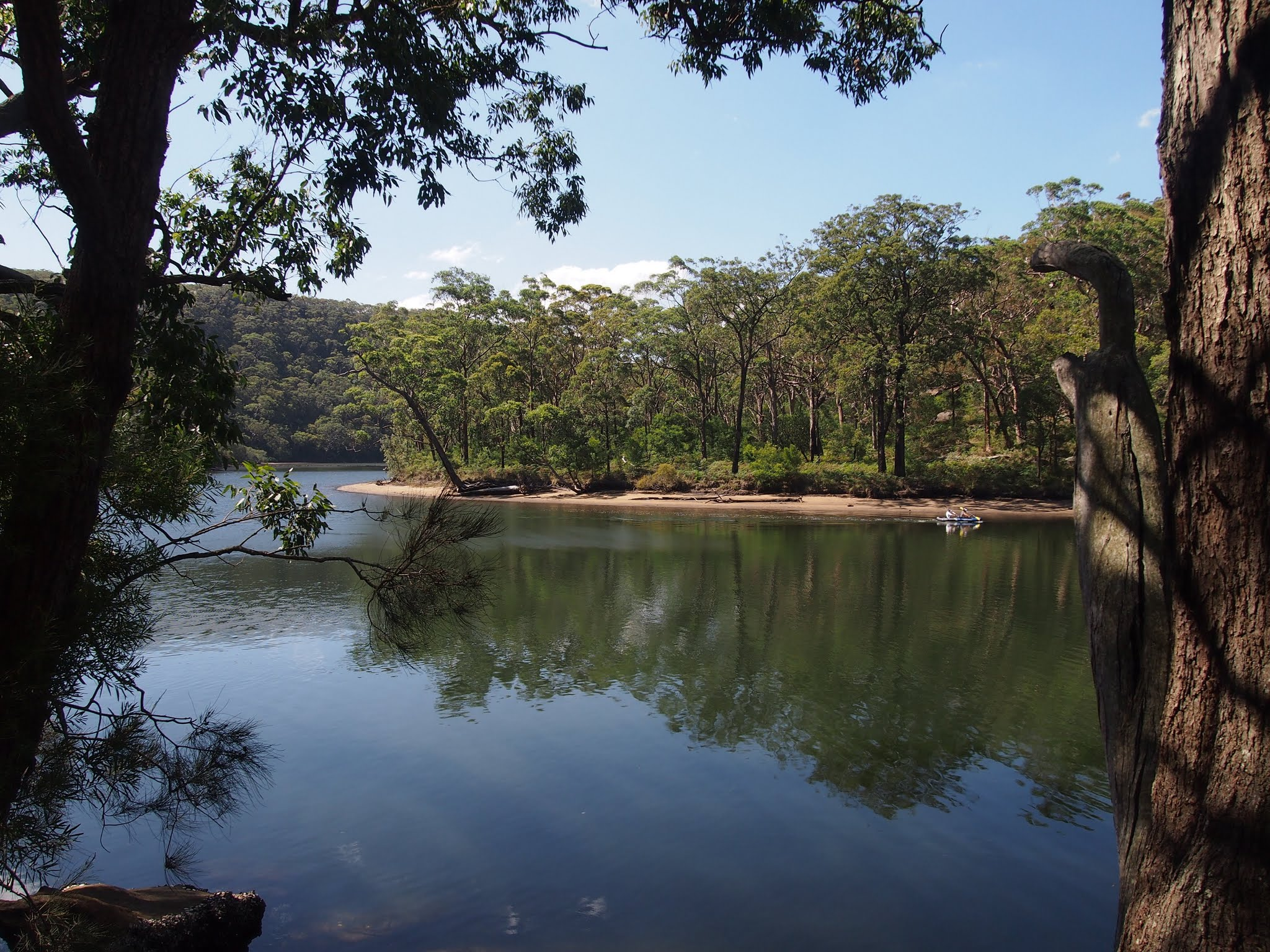
Riverside Drive (#5)

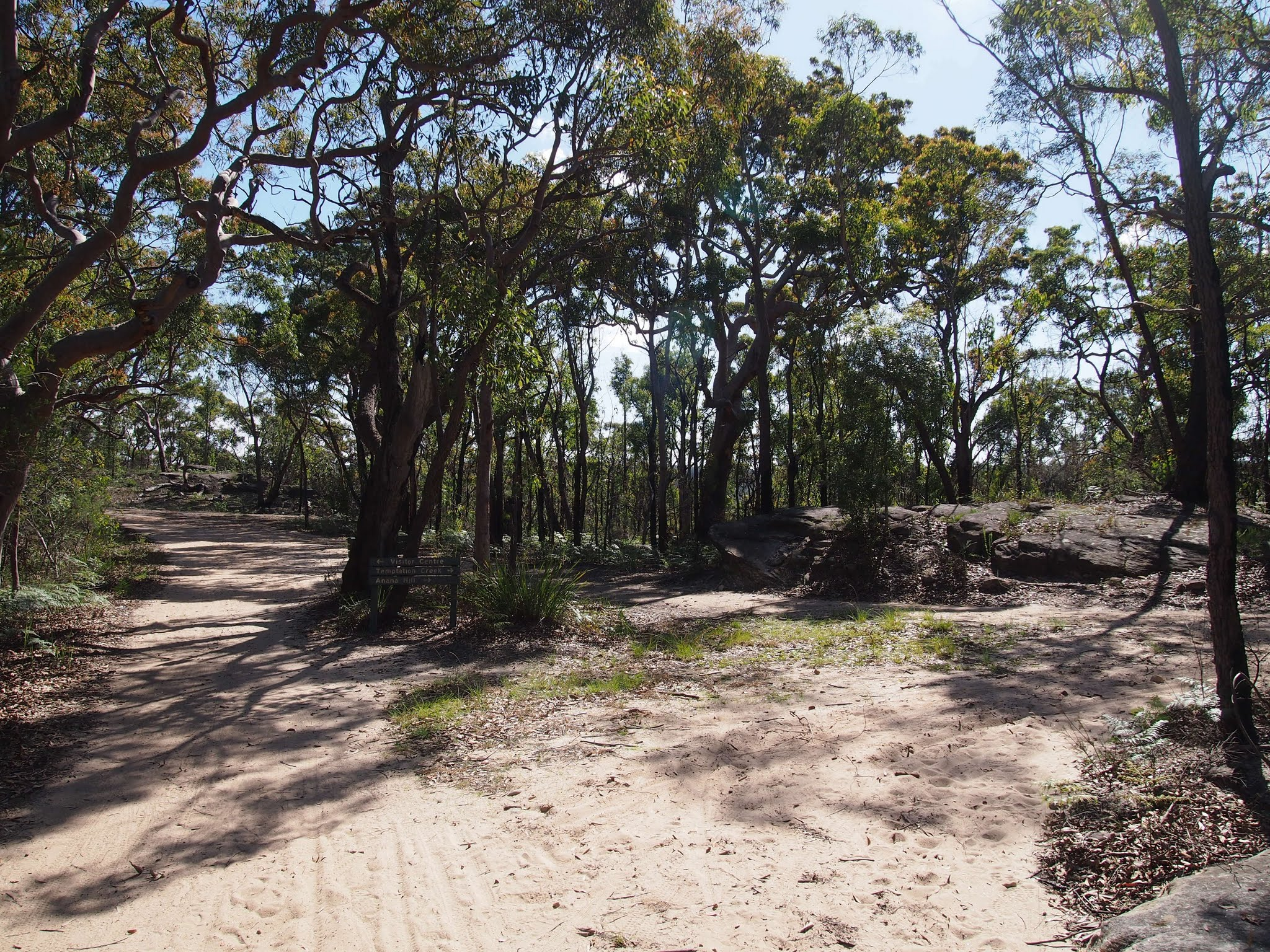
Florence Parade Trail

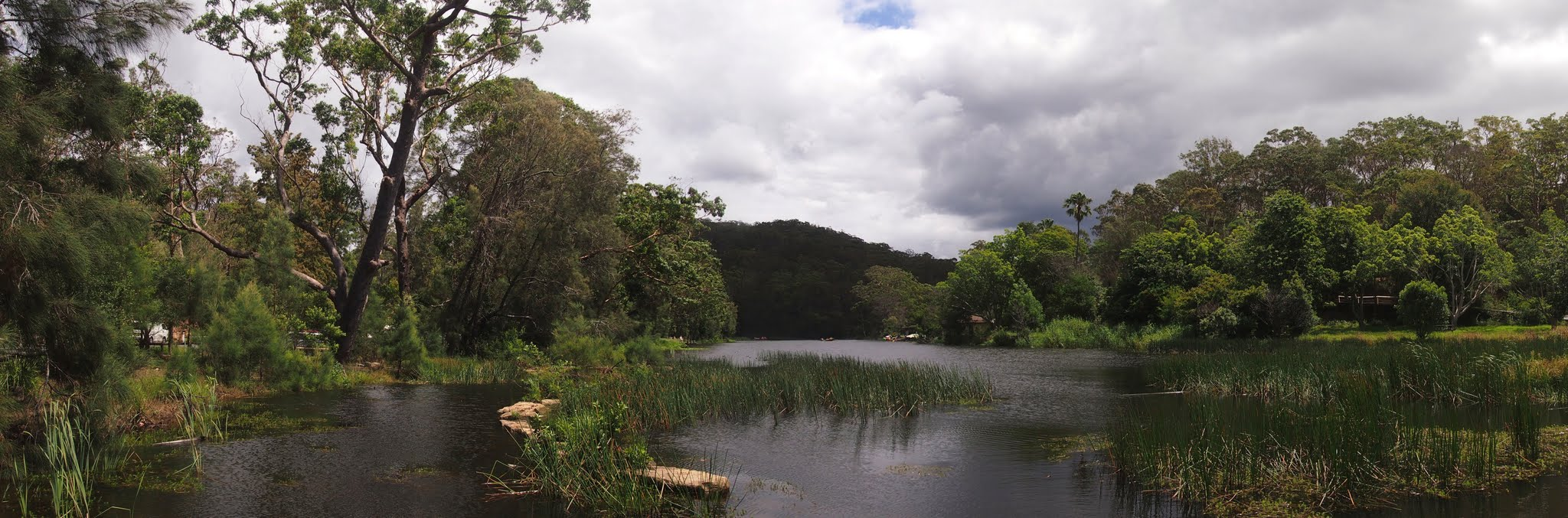
Audley Weir (#1)

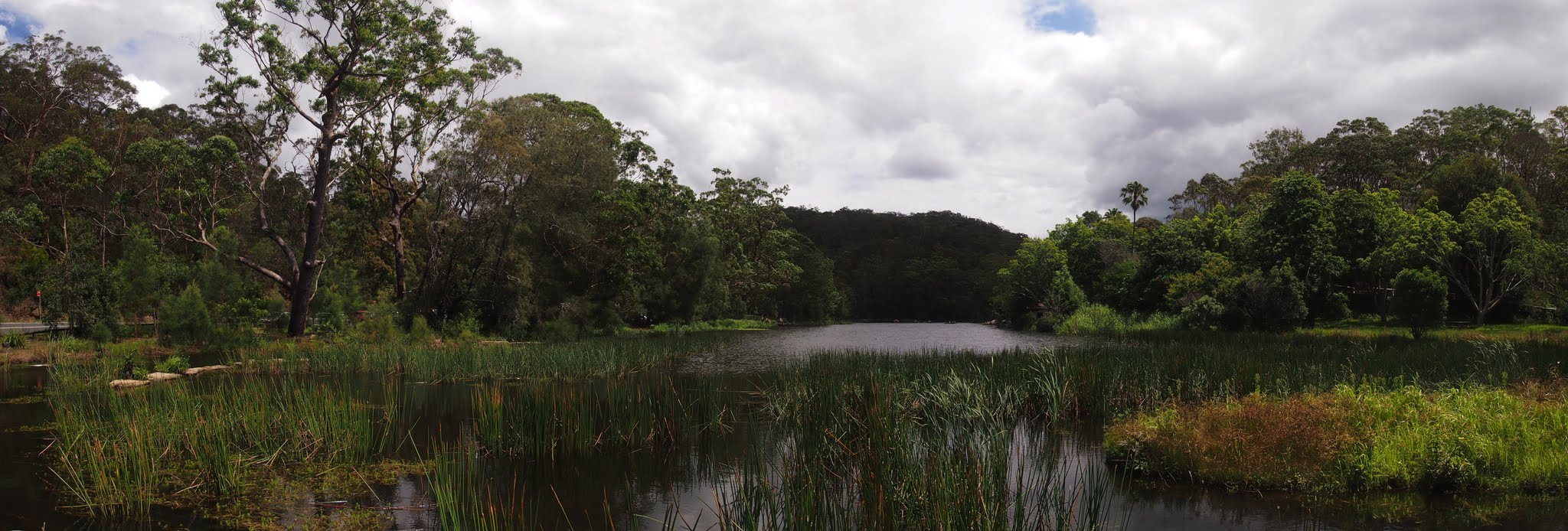
Audley Weir (#2)

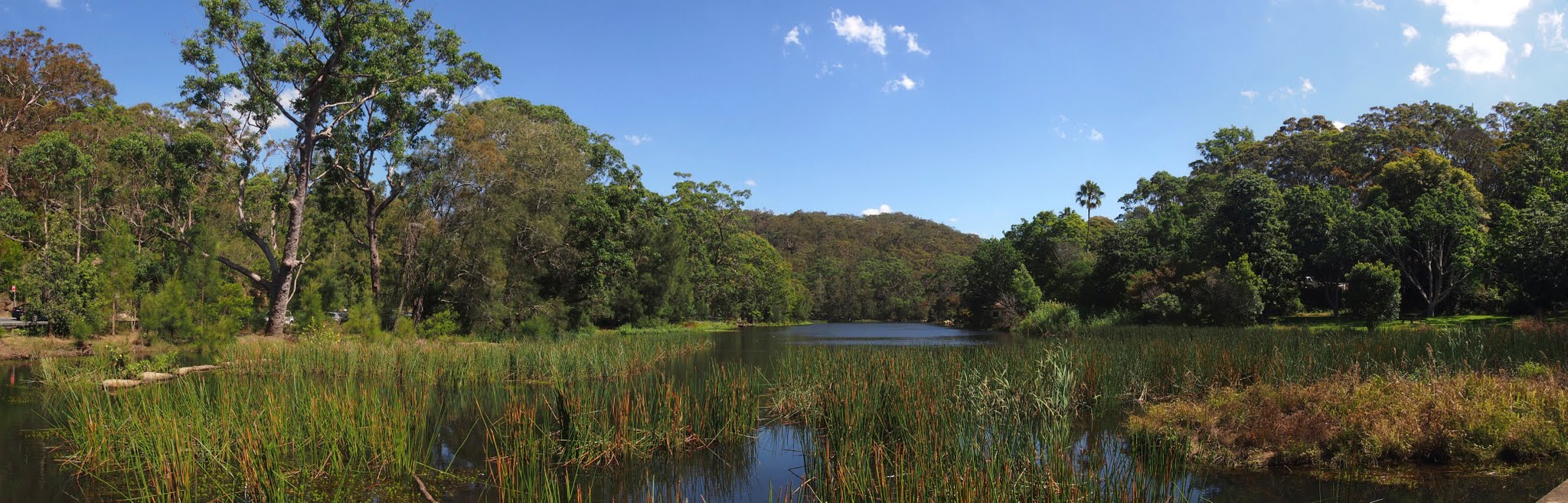
Audley Weir (#3)

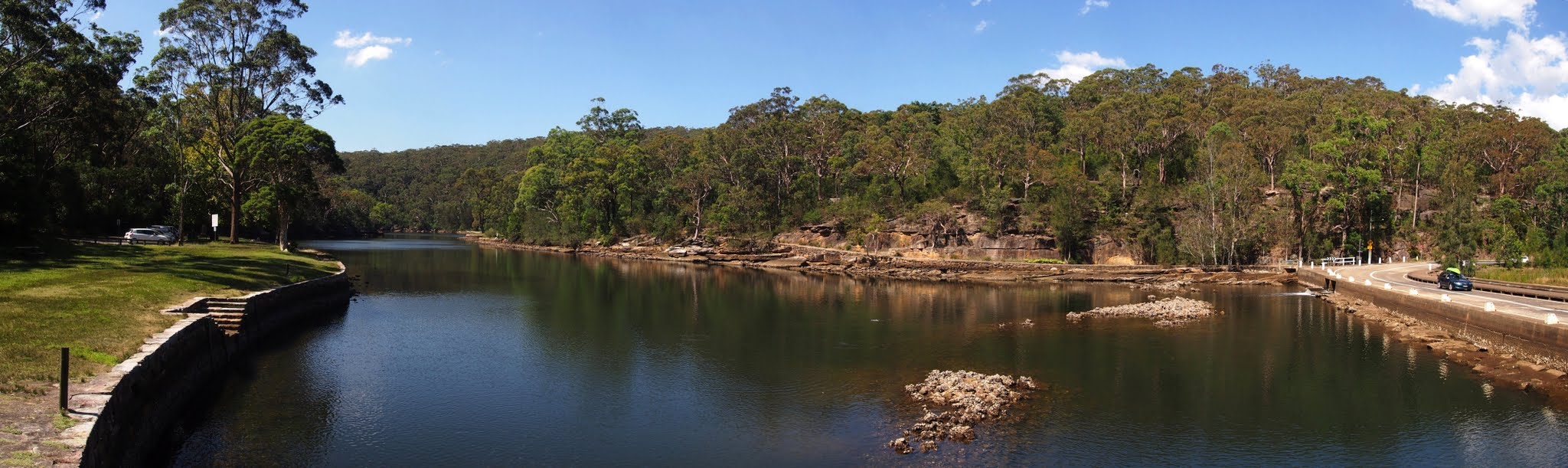
Audley Weir (#4)

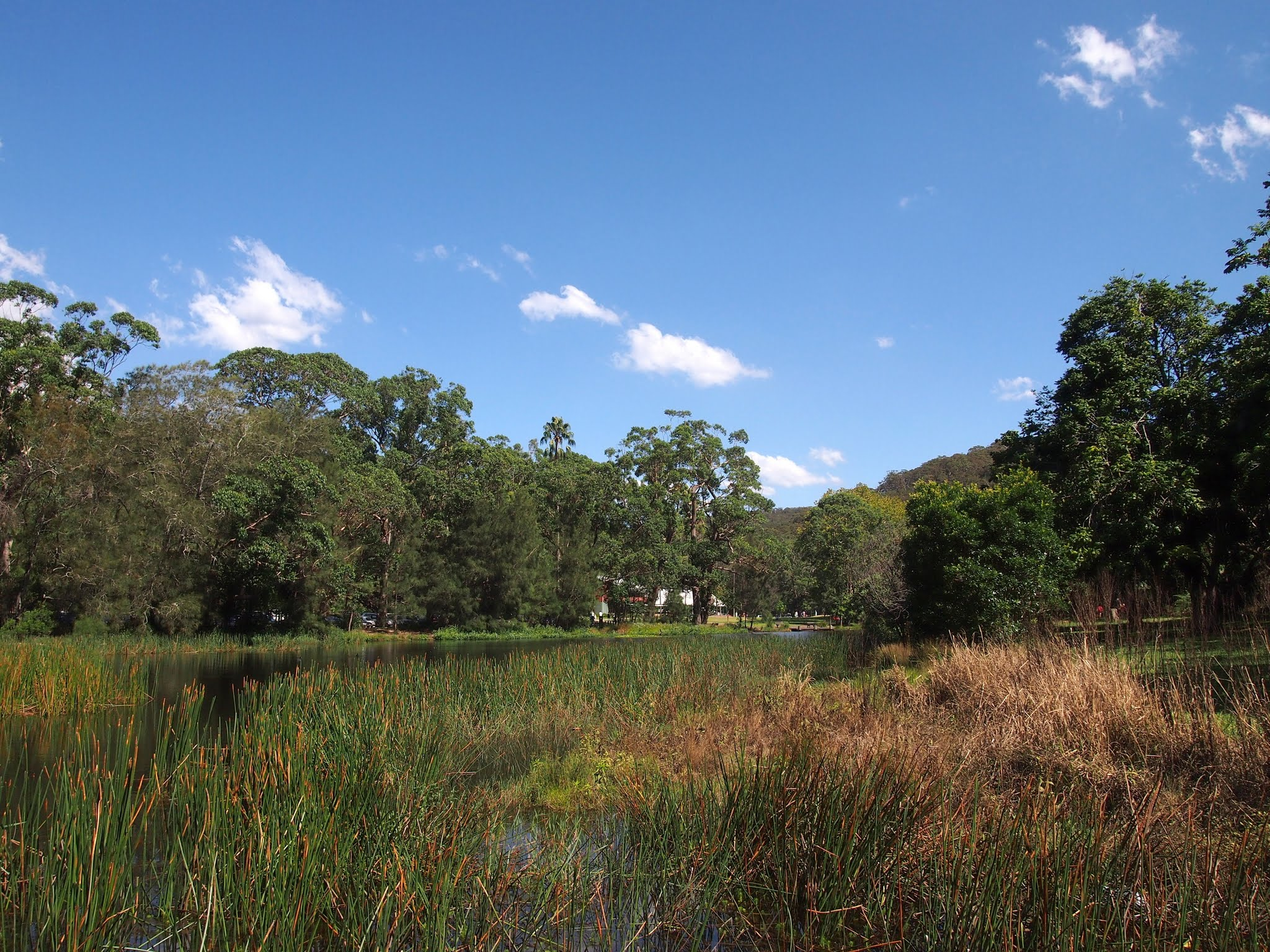
Audley Weir (#5)

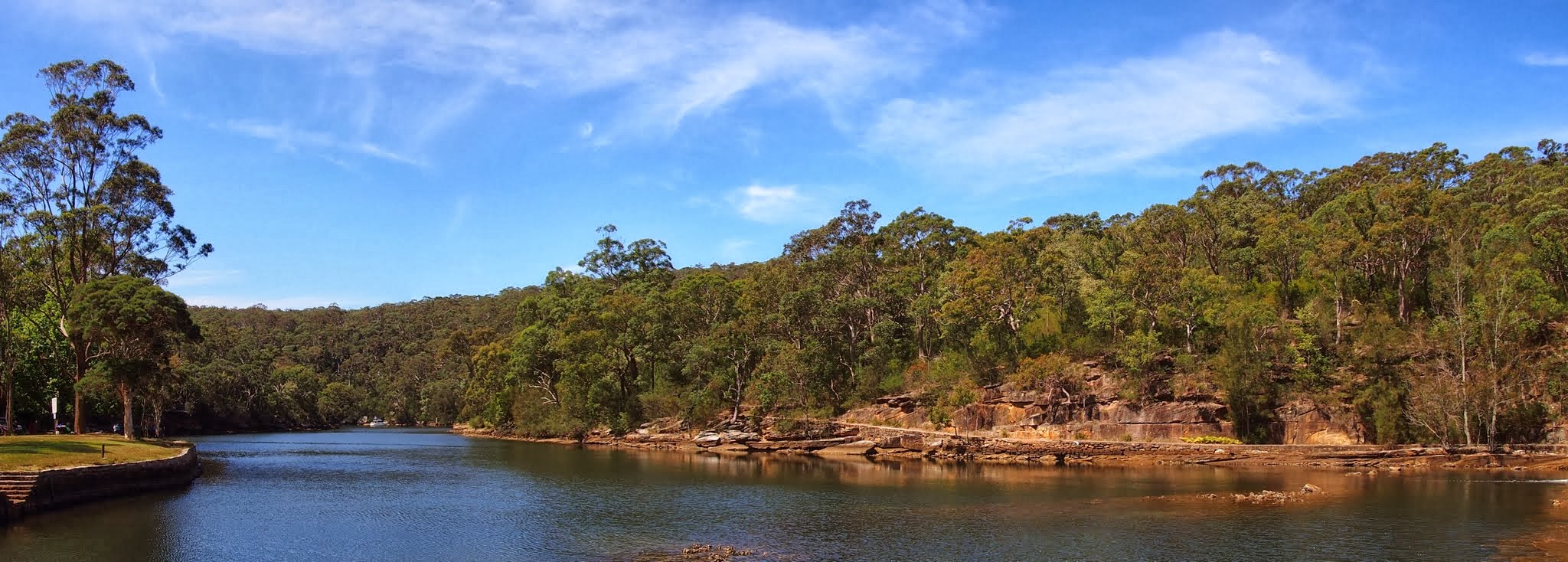
Audley Weir (#6)

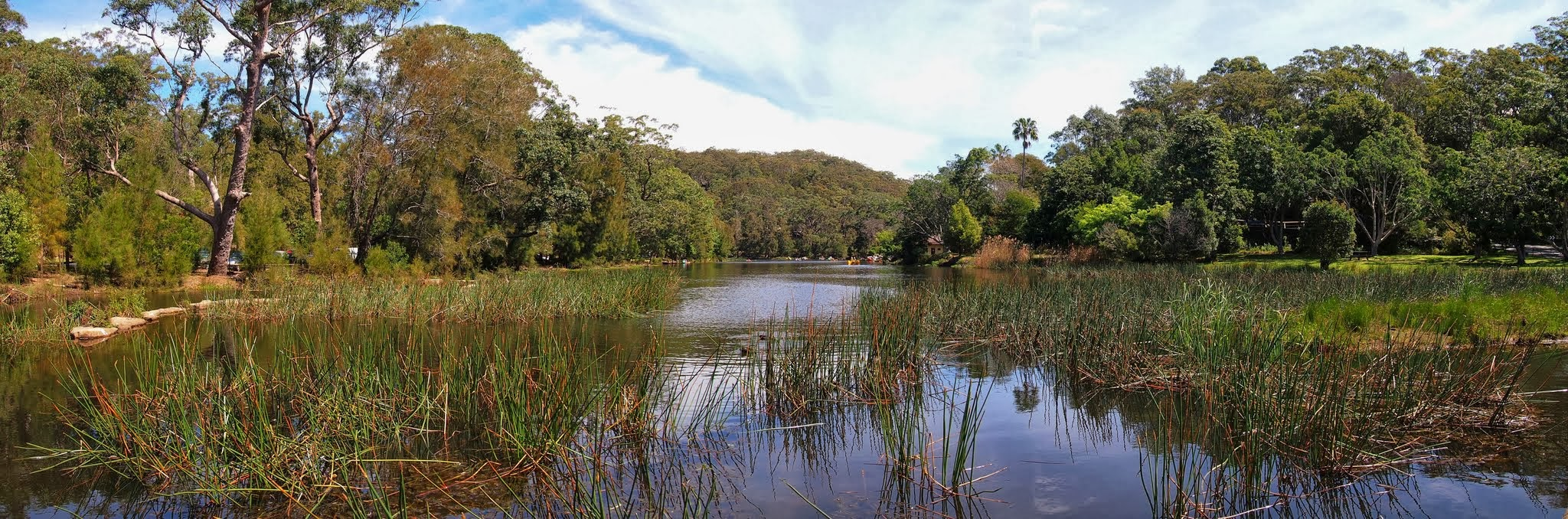
Audley Weir (#7)

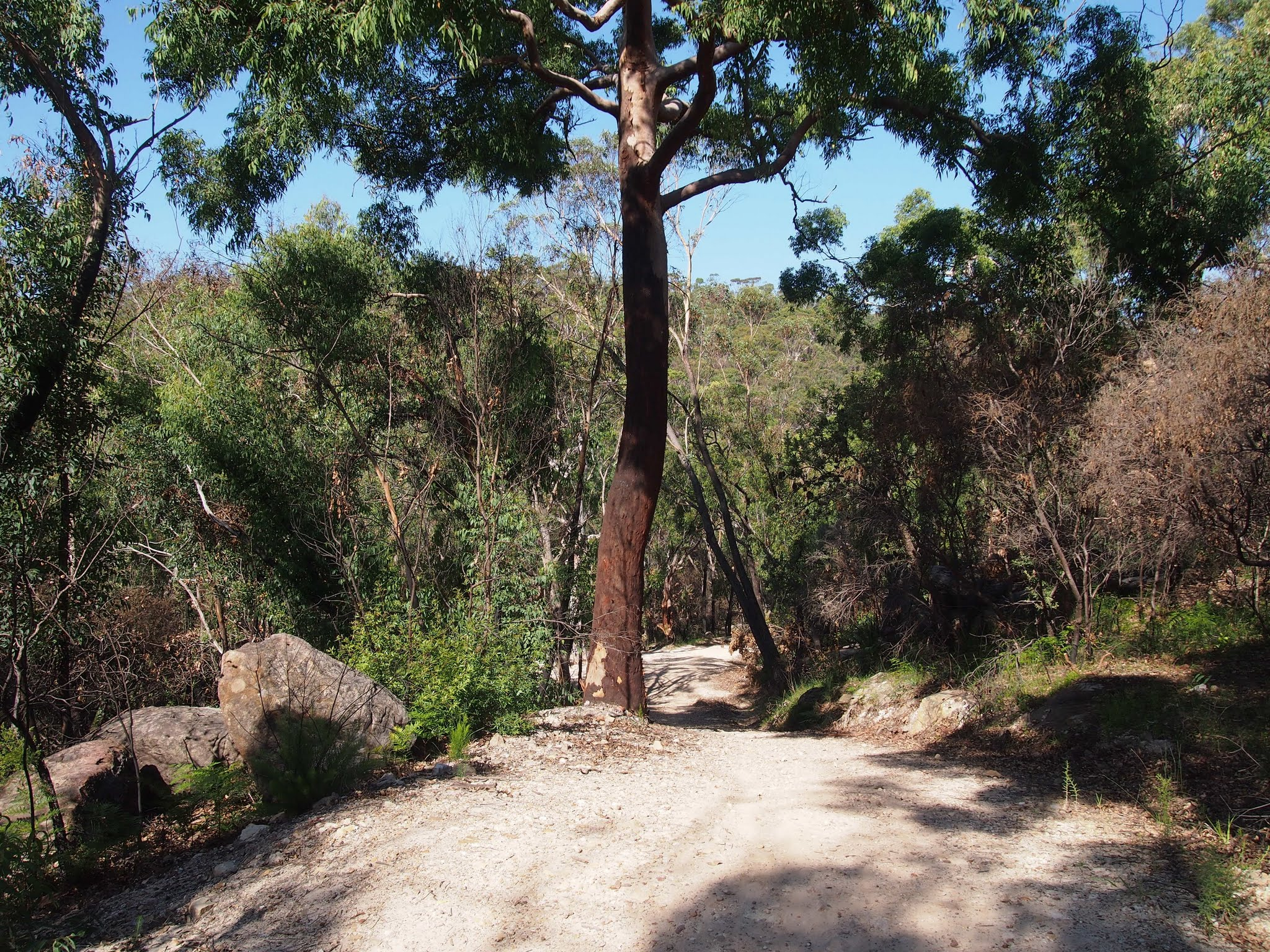
Temptation Creek Trail (#1)

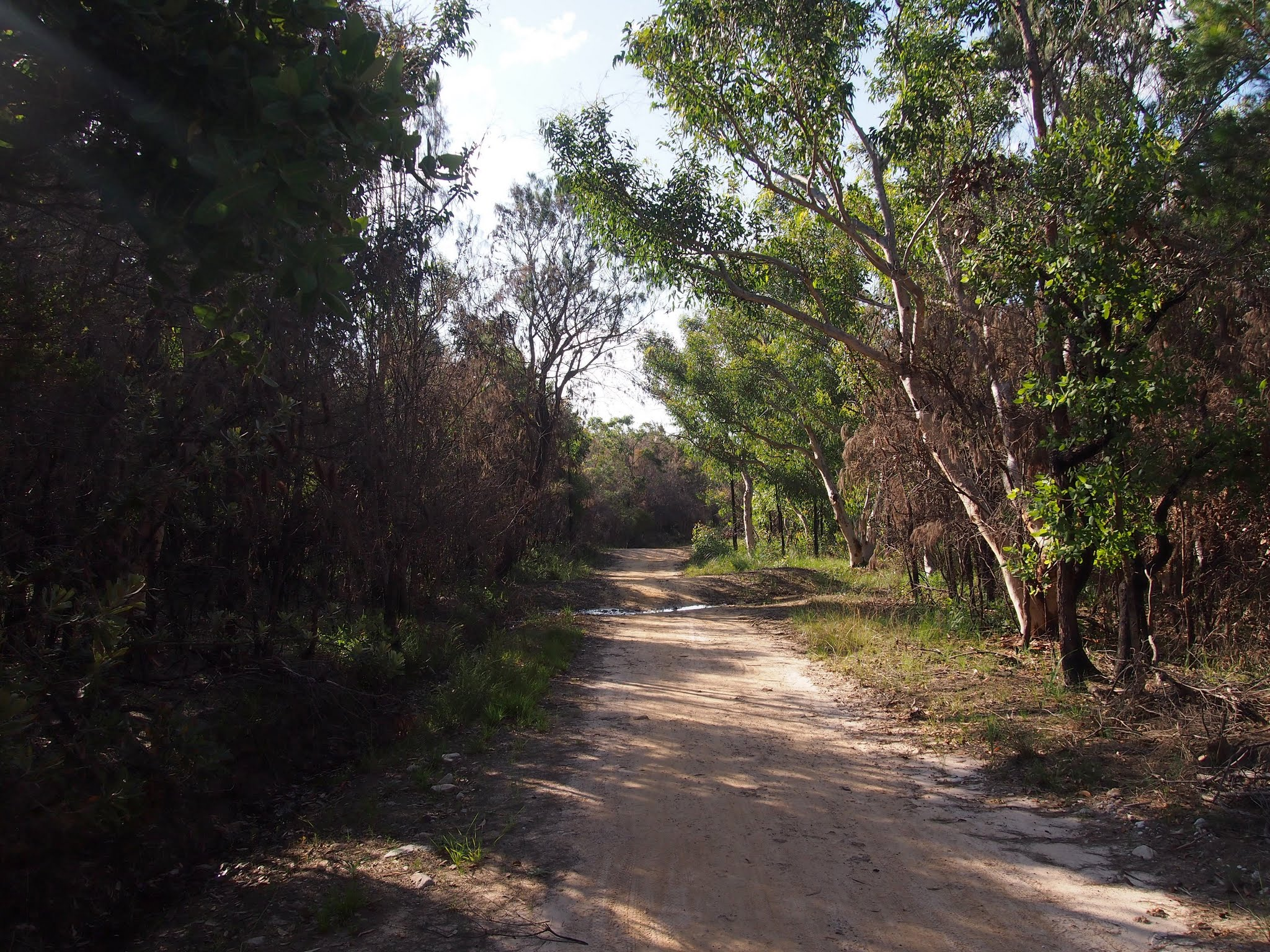
Temptation Creek Trail (#2)

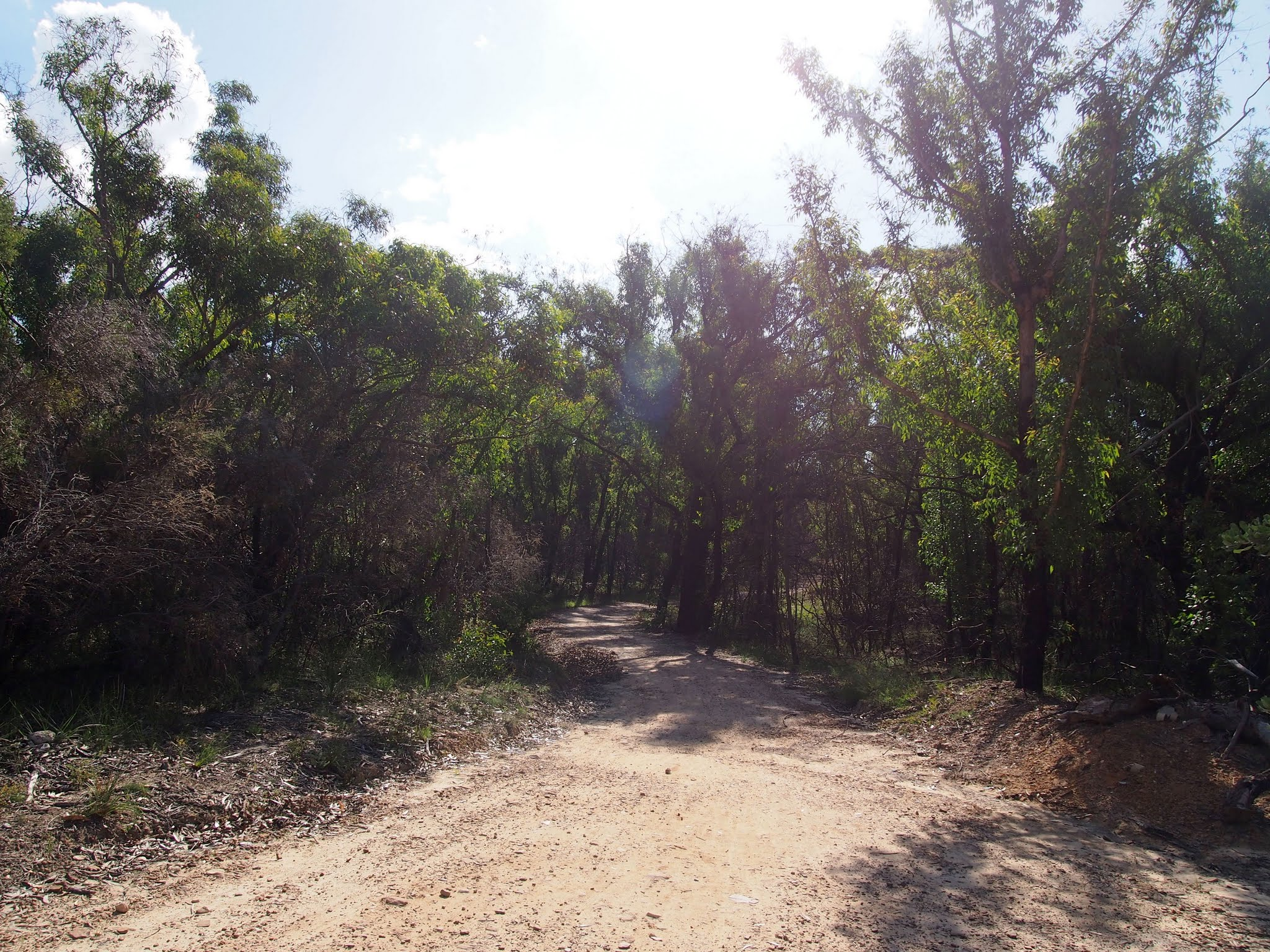
Temptation Creek Trail (#3)

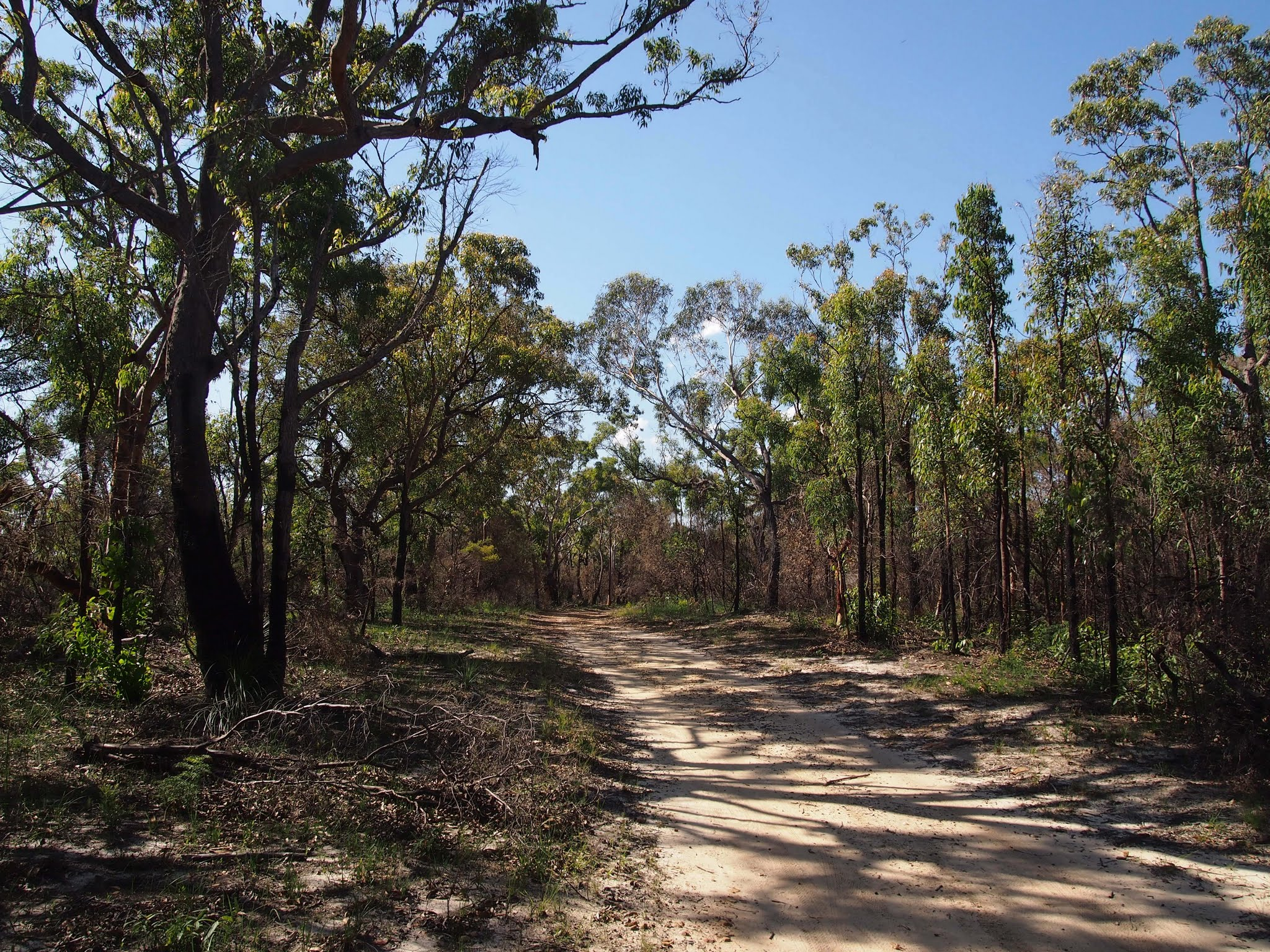
Temptation Creek Trail (#4)

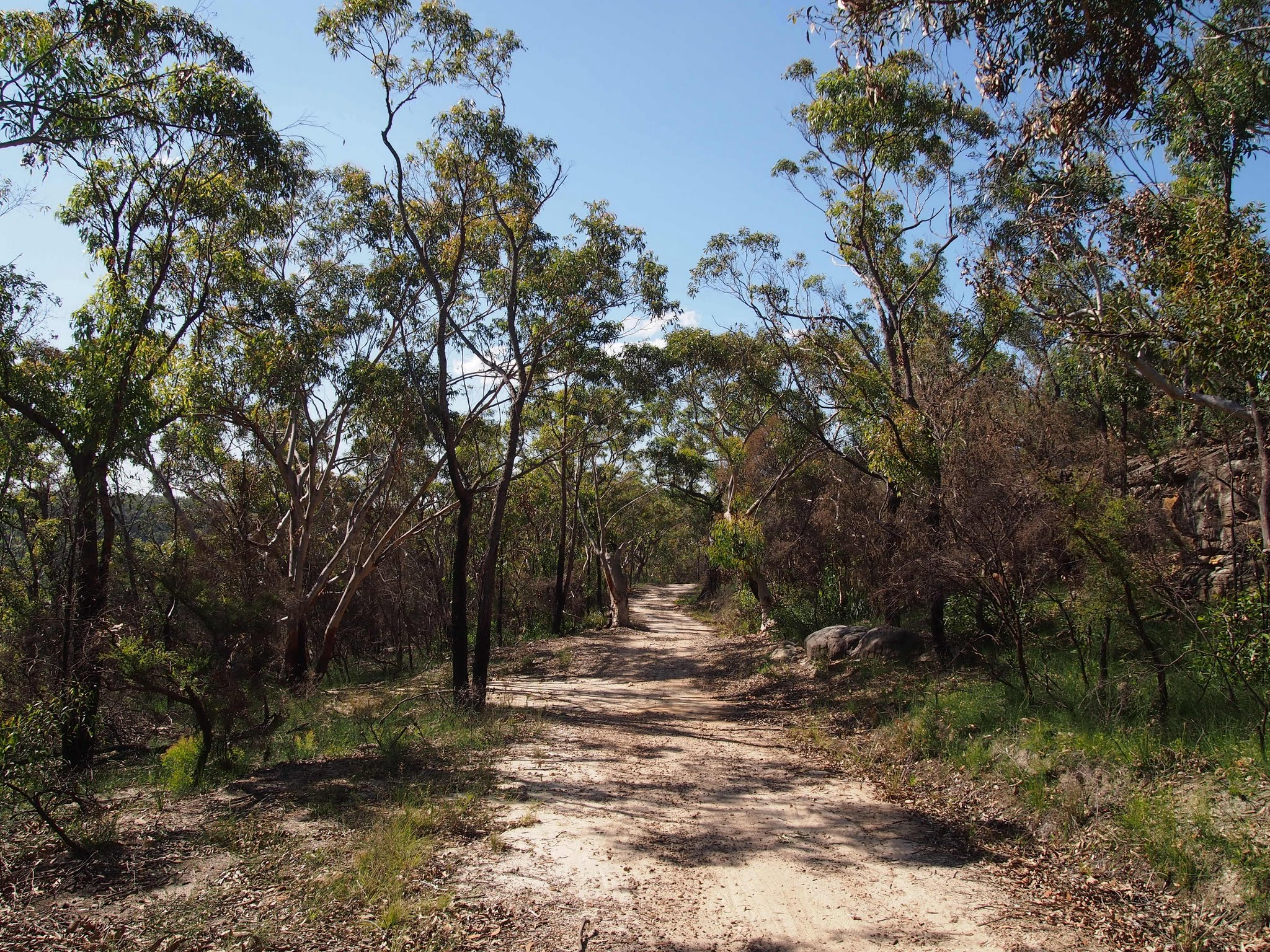
Temptation Creek Trail (#5)

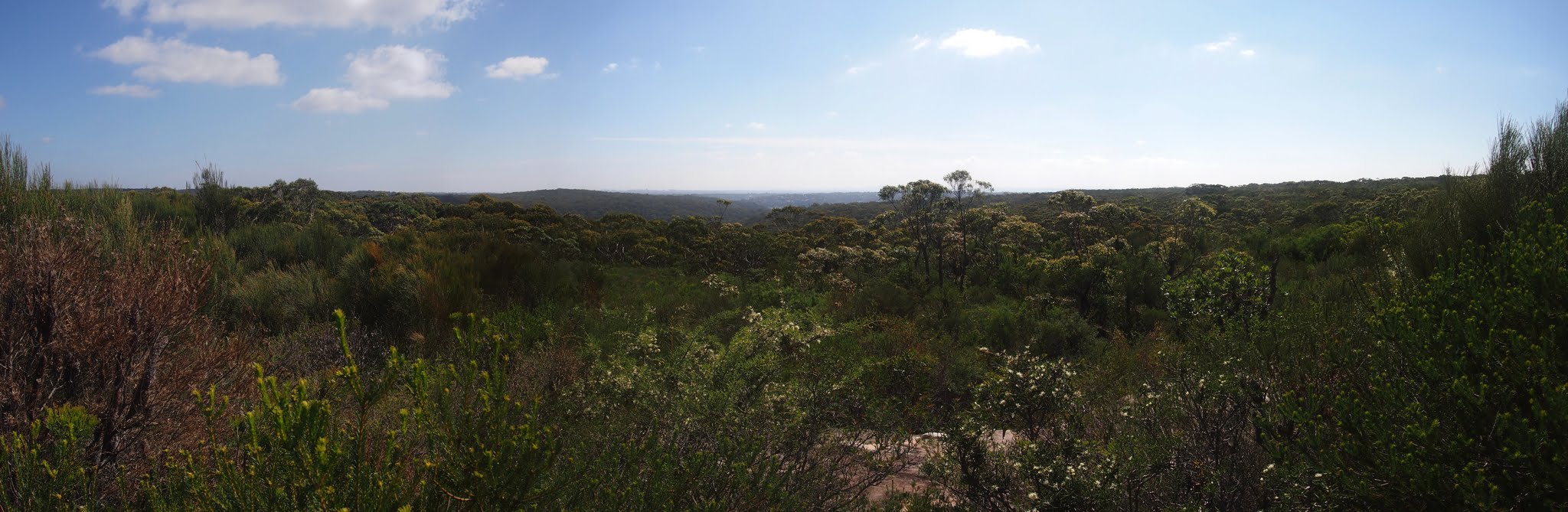
Anice Falls Track (#1)

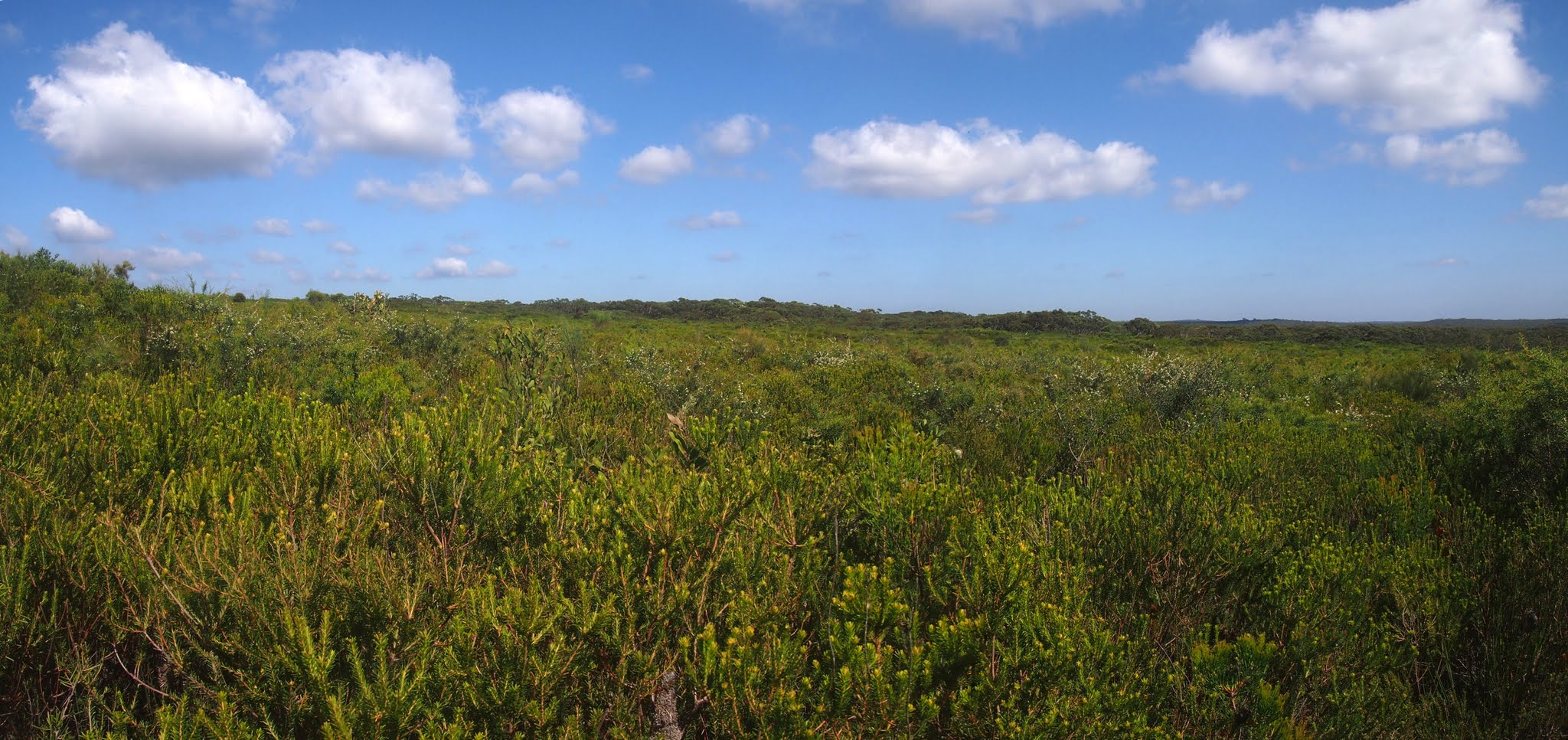
Anice Falls Track (#2)

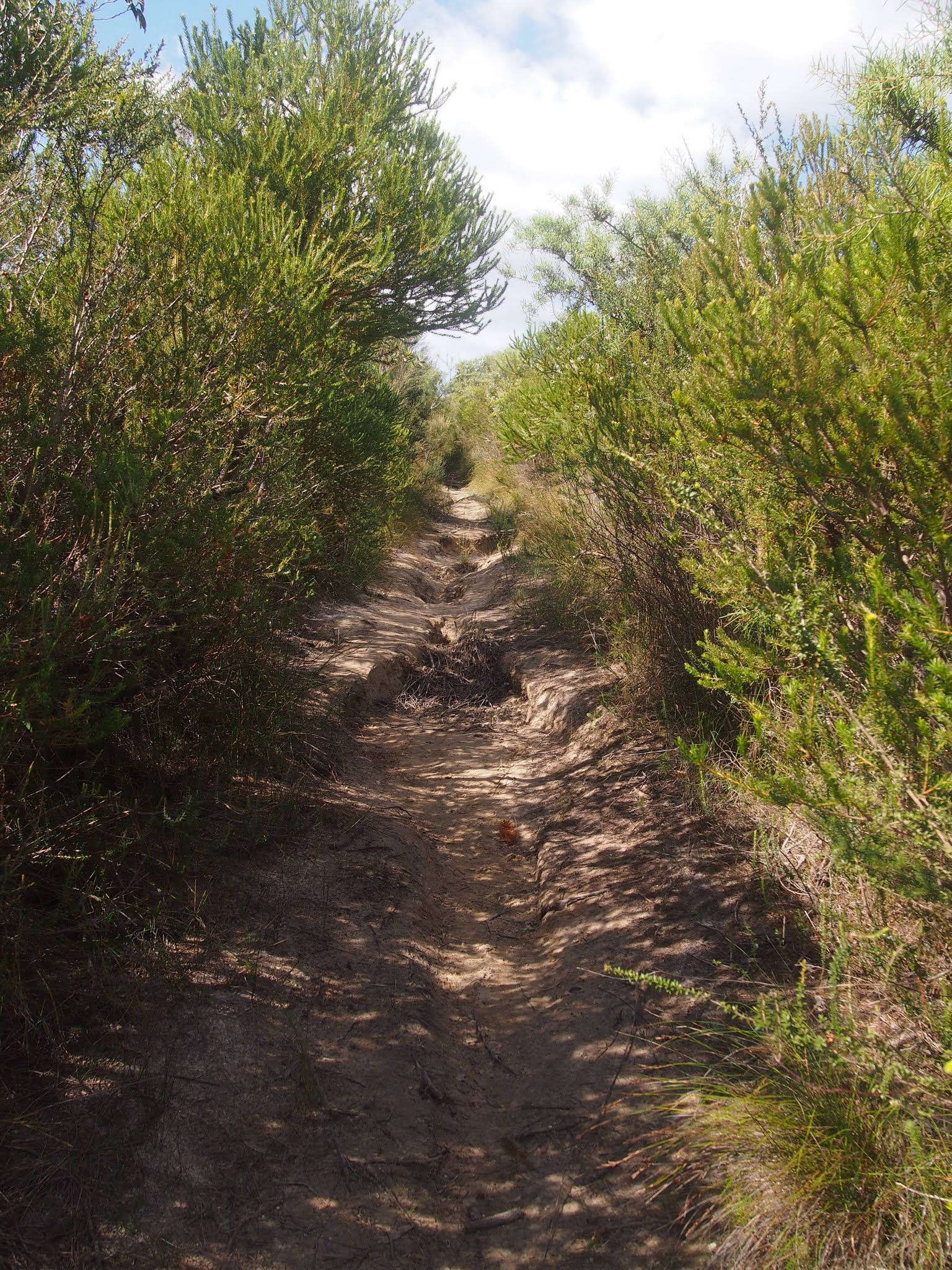
Anice Falls Track (#3)

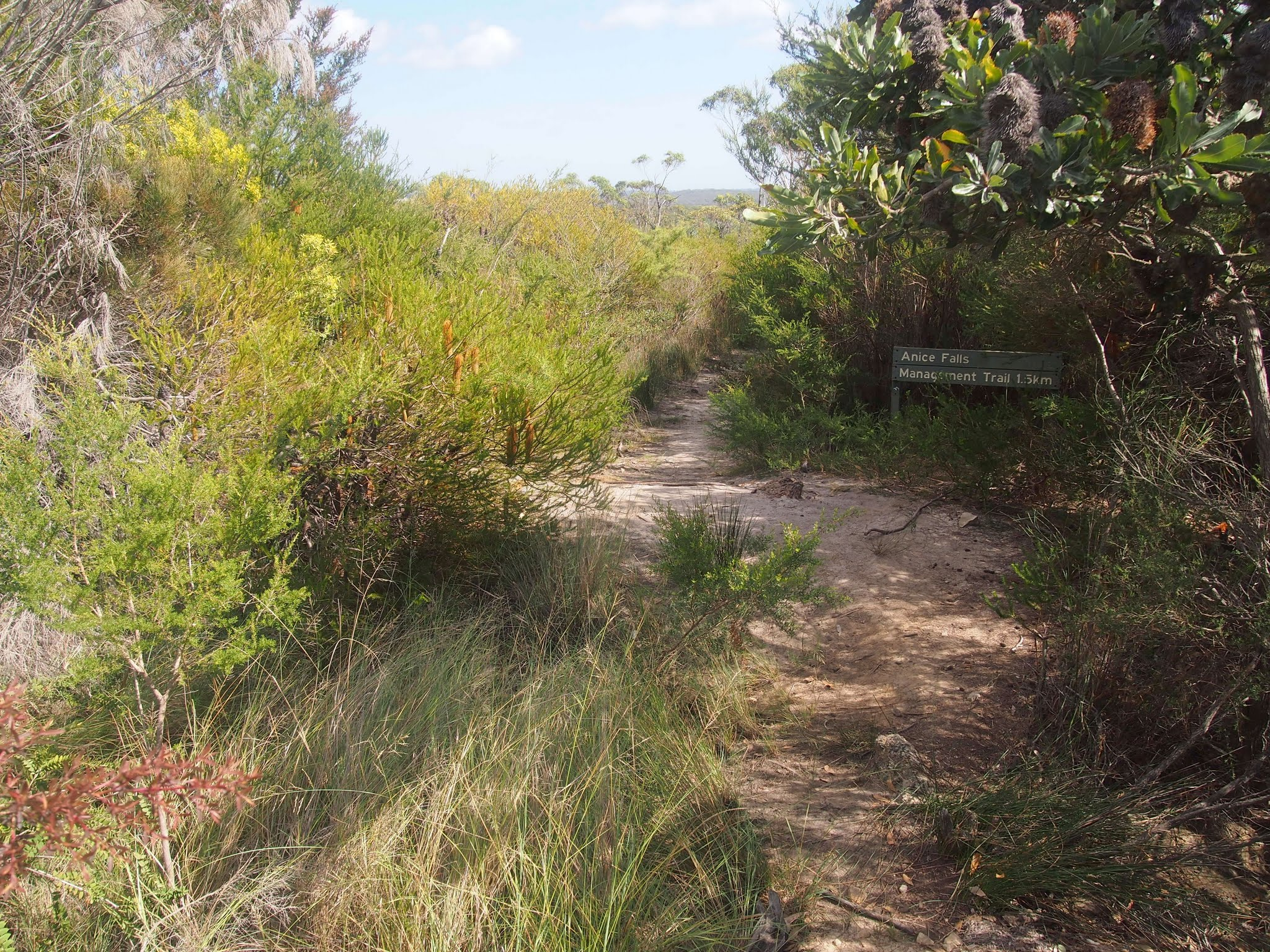
Anice Falls Track (#4)

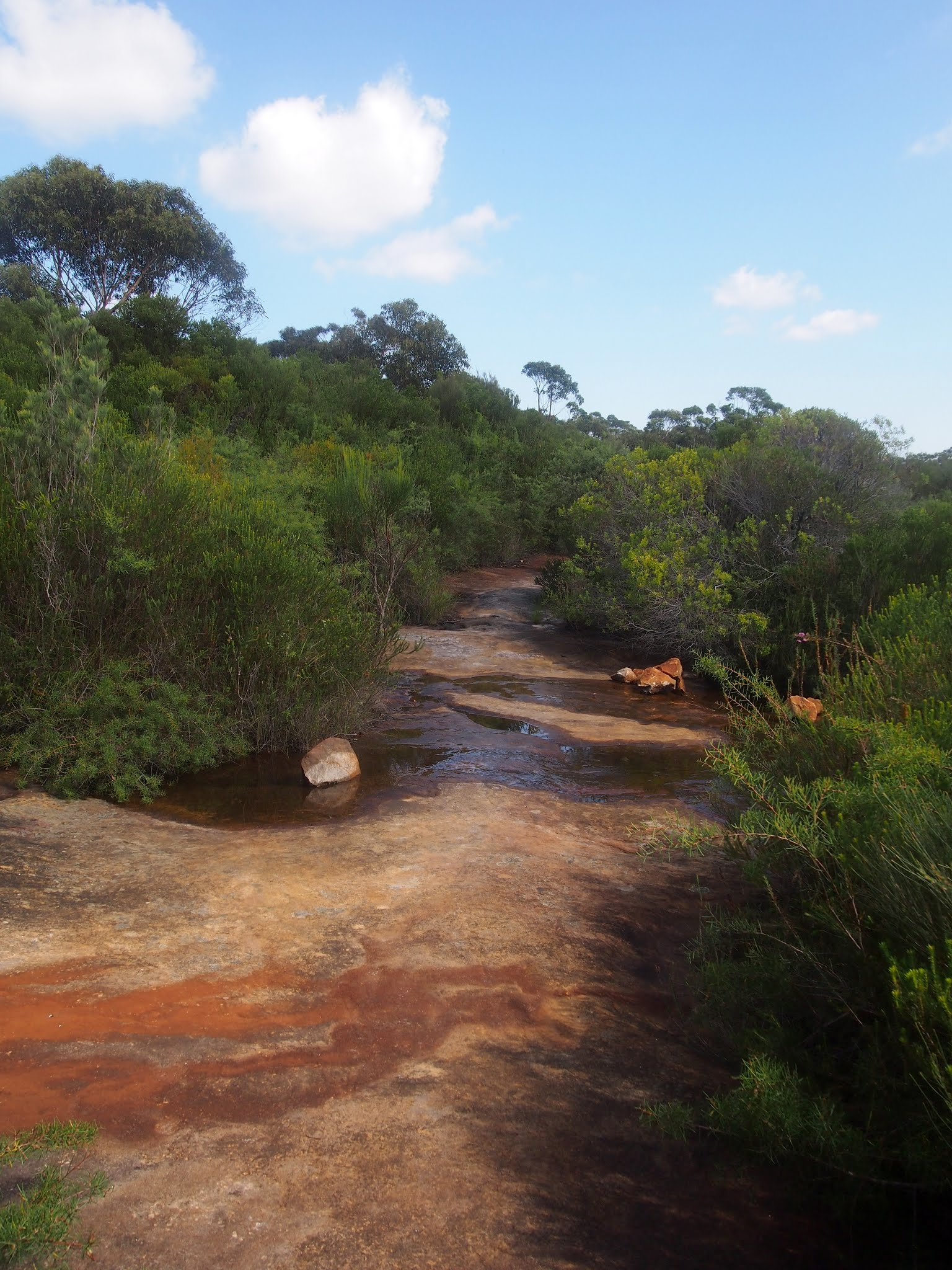
Anice Falls Track (#5)

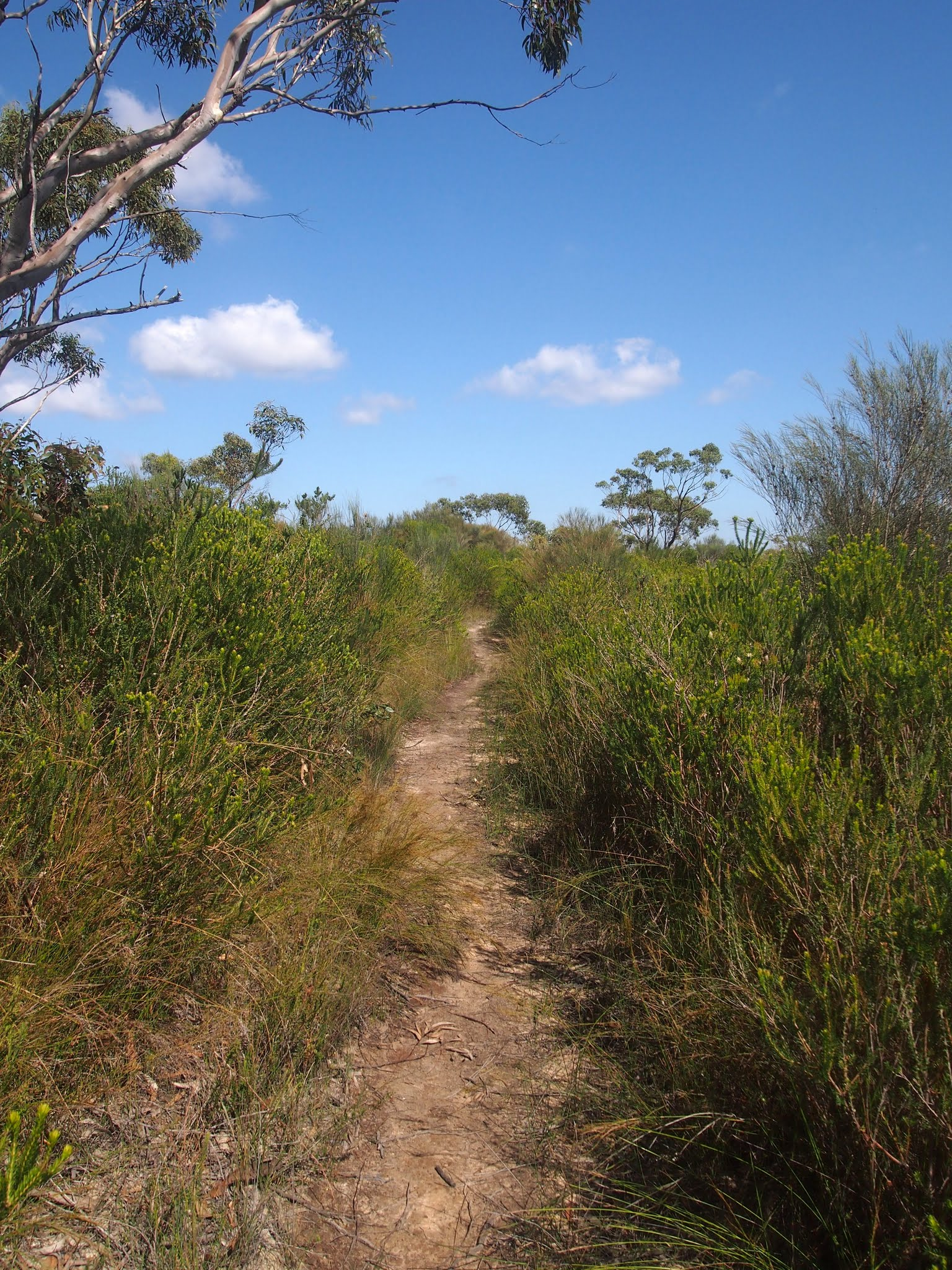
Anice Falls Track (#6)

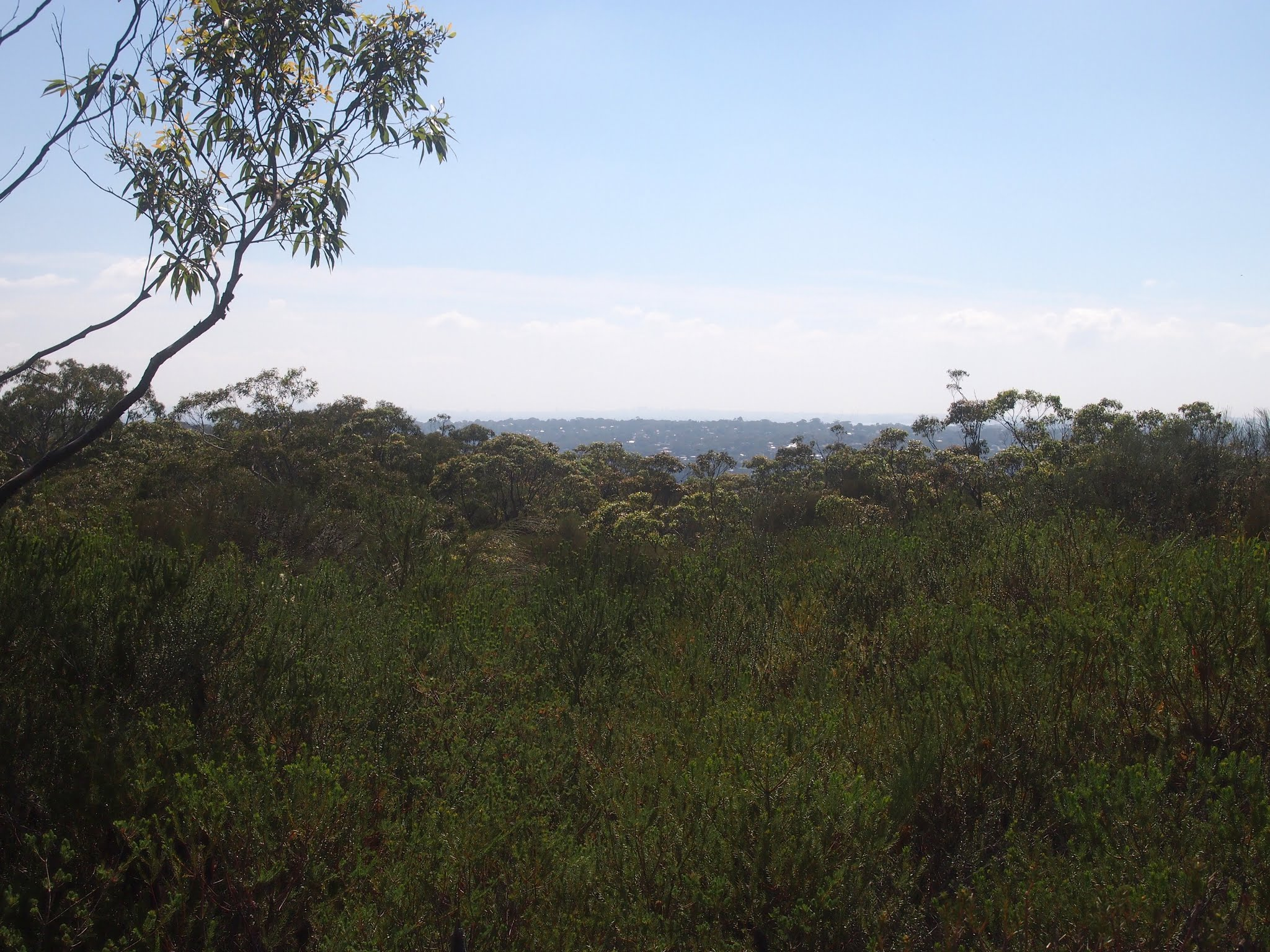
Anice Falls Track (#7)

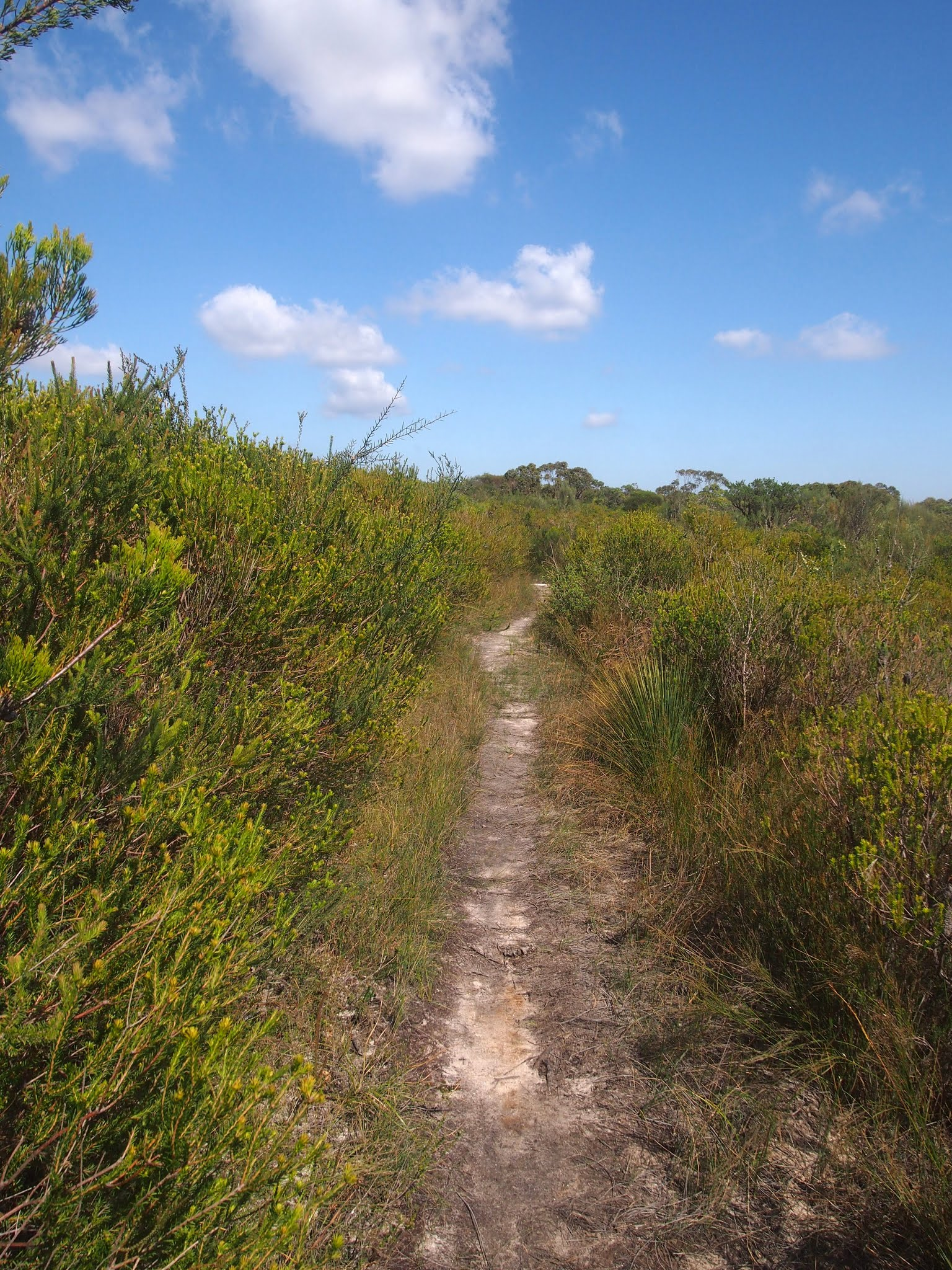
Anice Falls Track (#8)

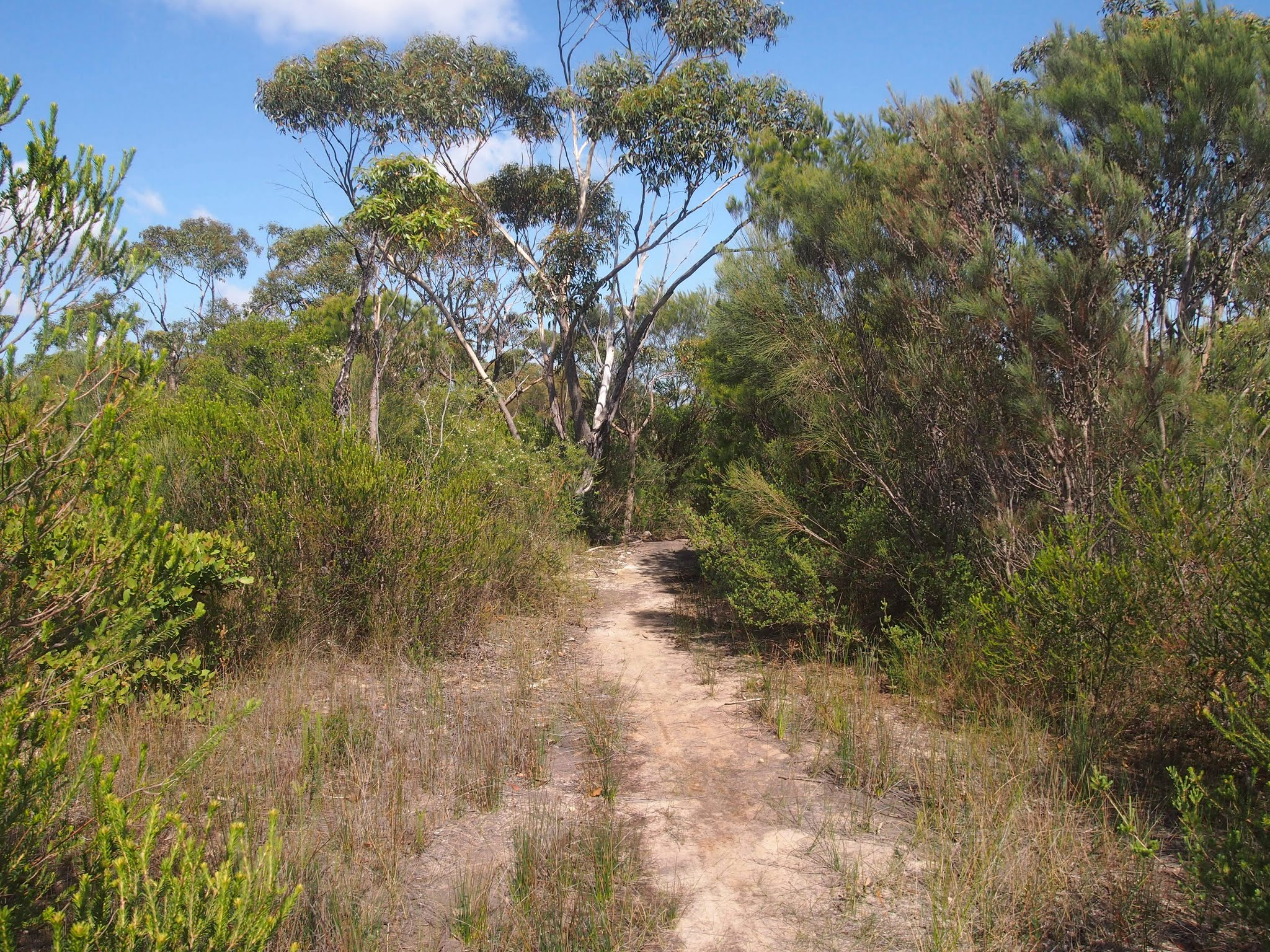
Anice Falls Track (#9)

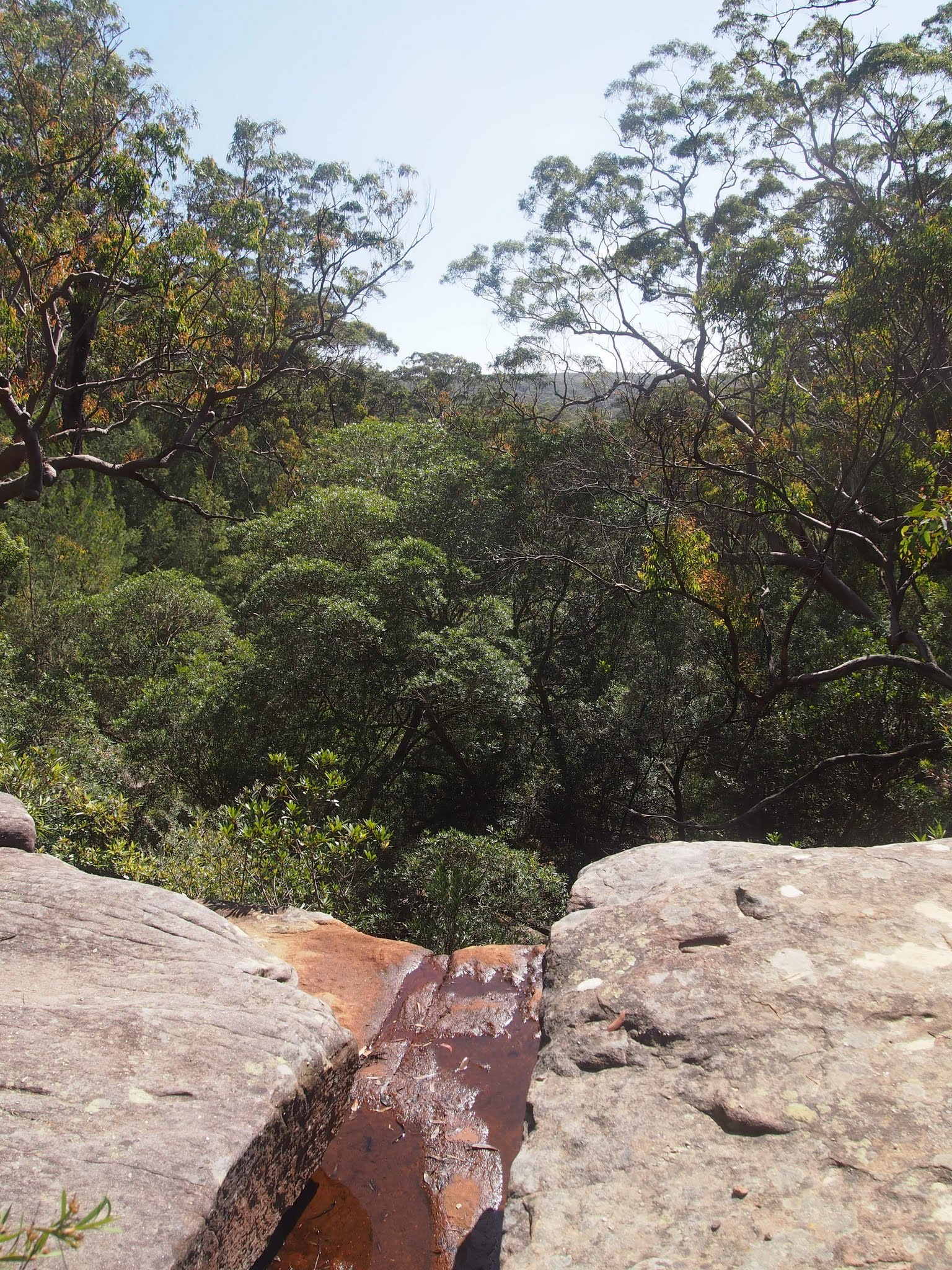
Anice Falls (#1)

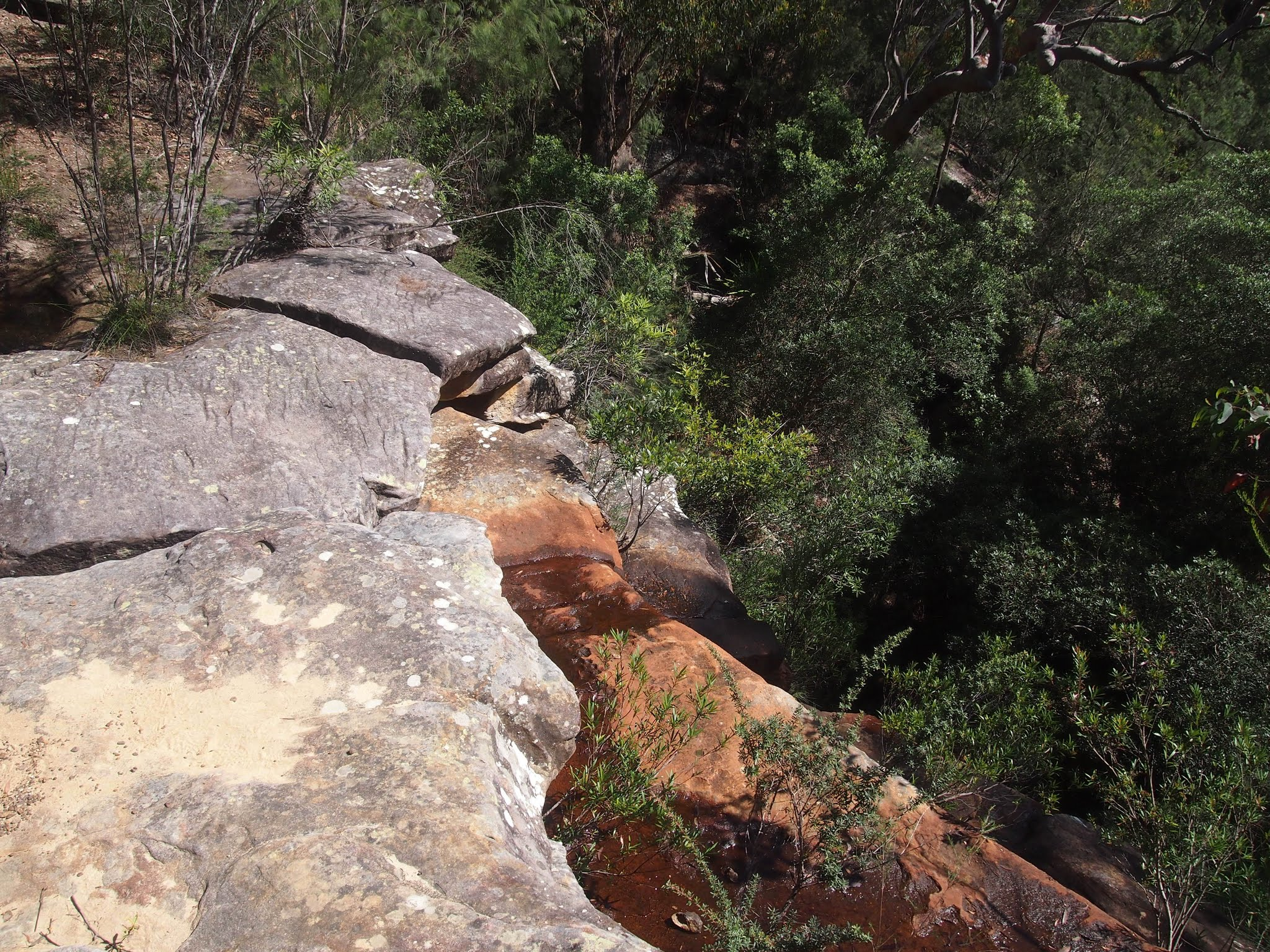
Anice Falls (#2)

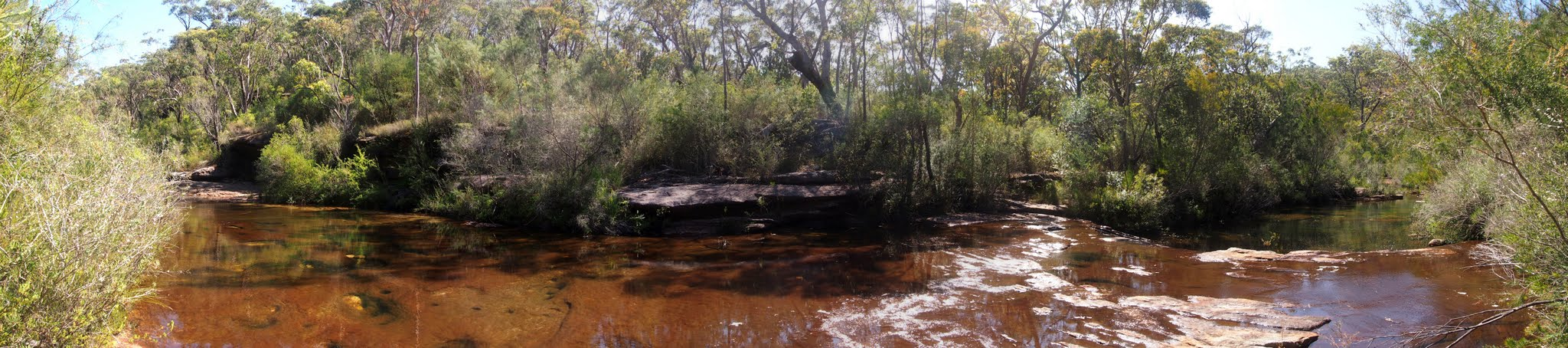
Winifred Falls Track (#1)

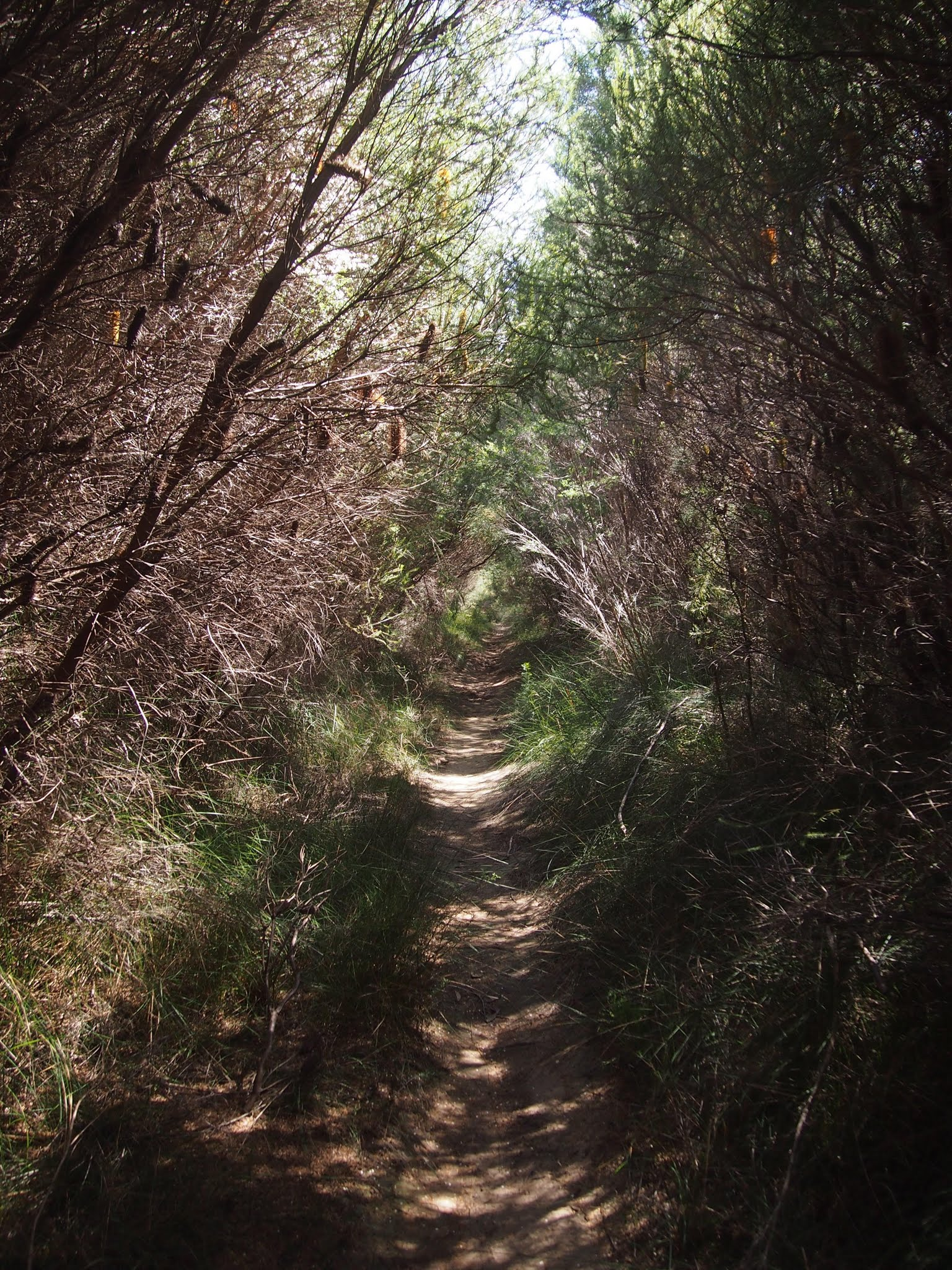
Winifred Falls Track (#2)

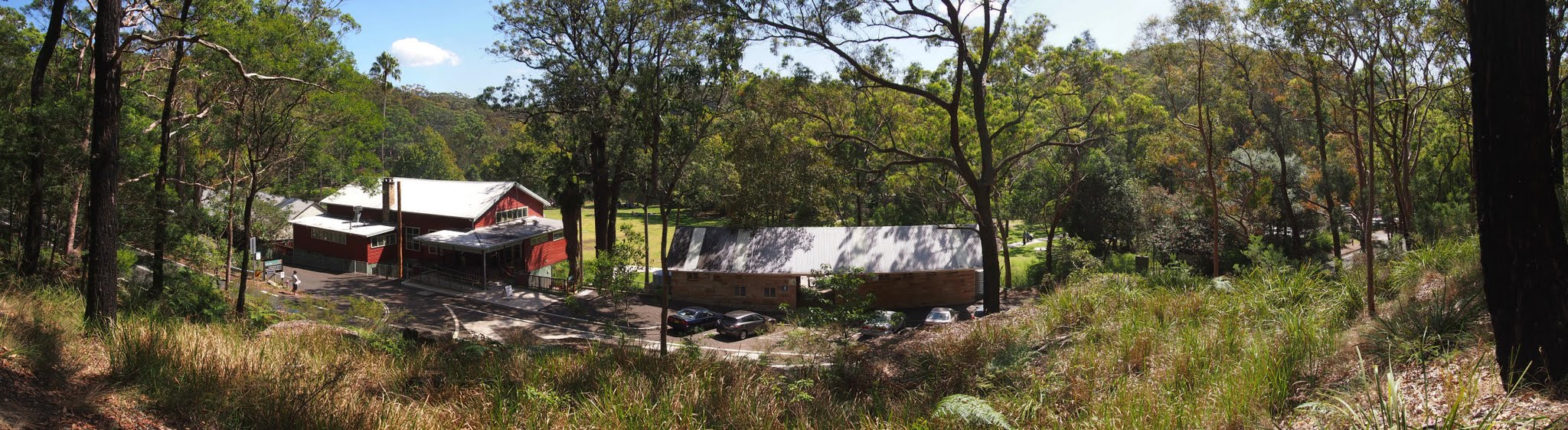
Winifred Falls Track (#3)

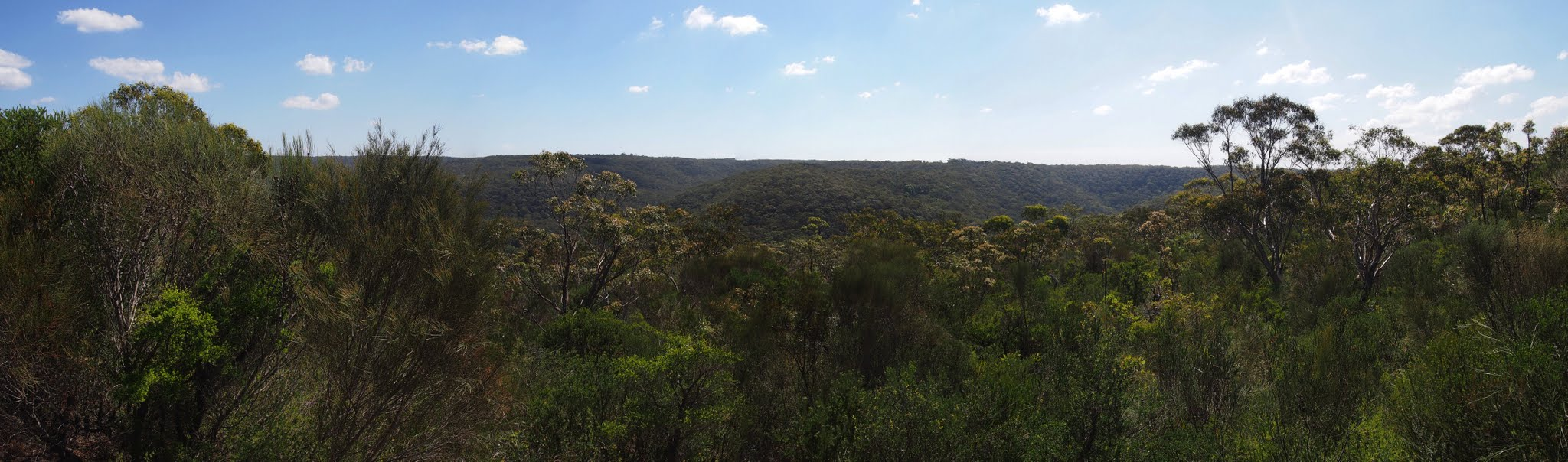
Winifred Falls Track (#4)

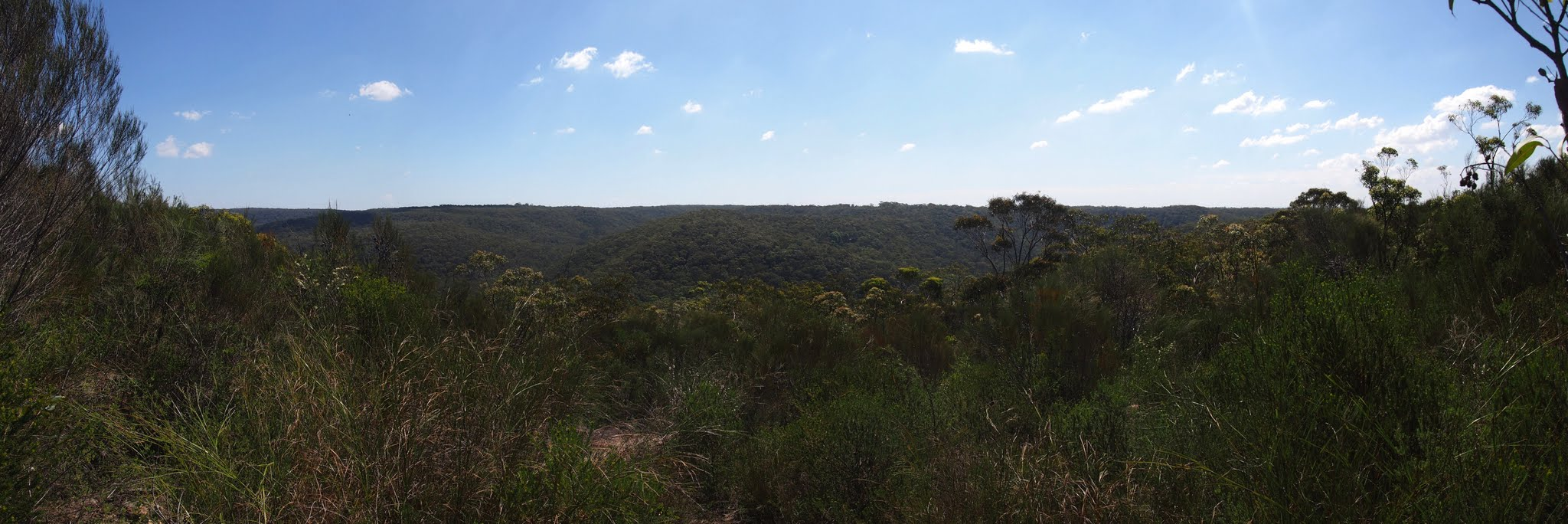
Winifred Falls Track (#5)

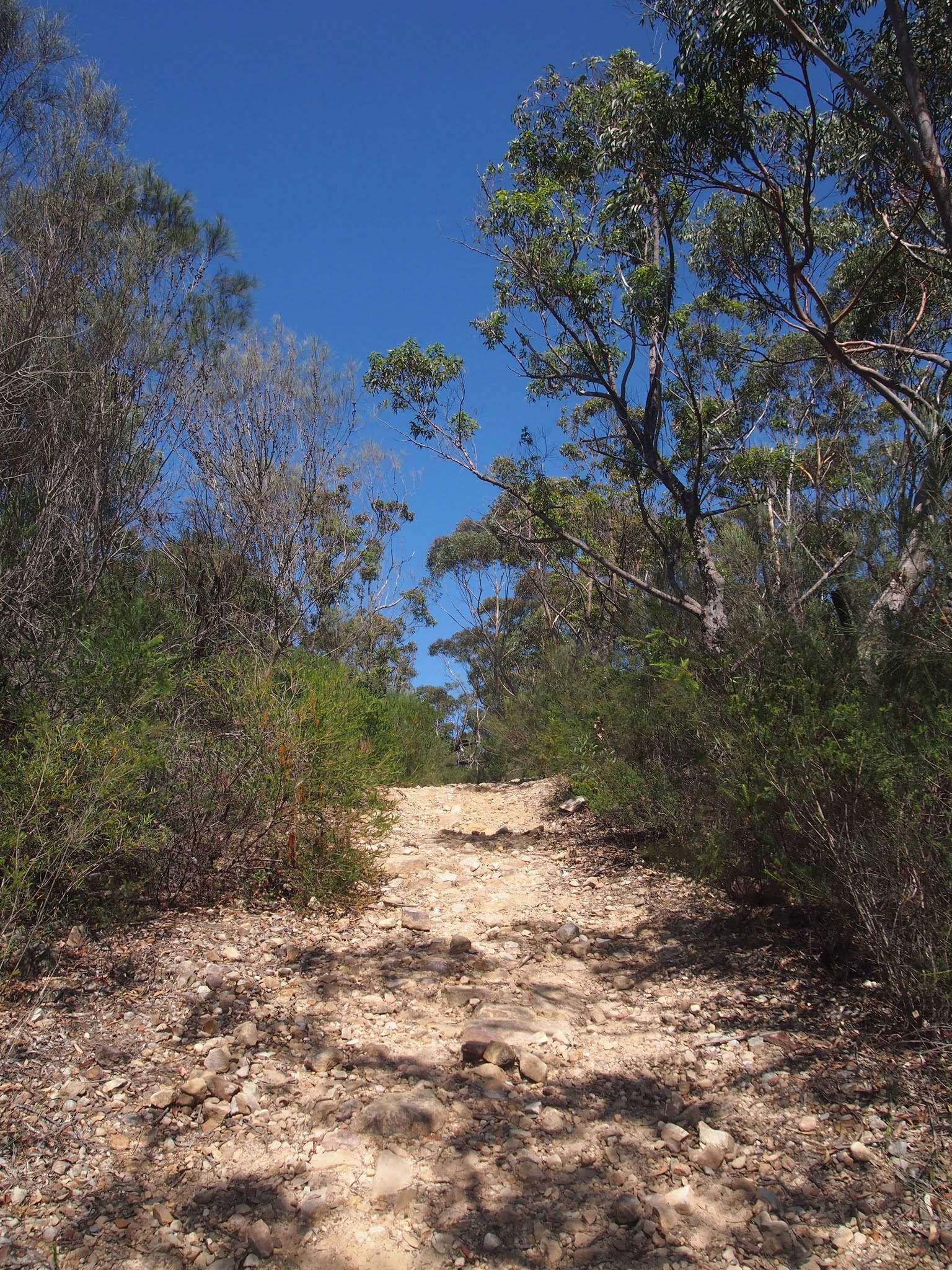
Winifred Falls Track (#6)

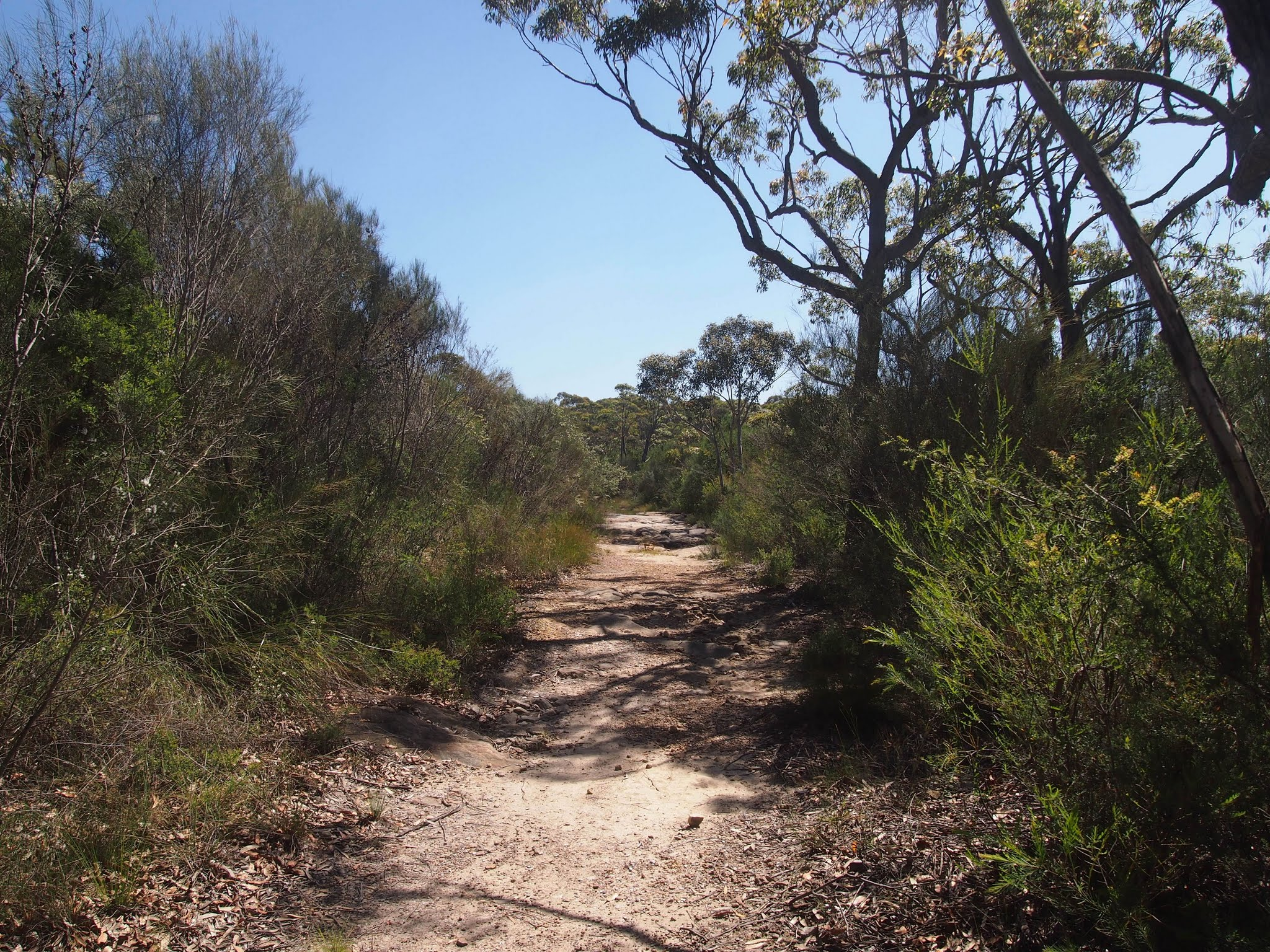
Winifred Falls Track (#7)

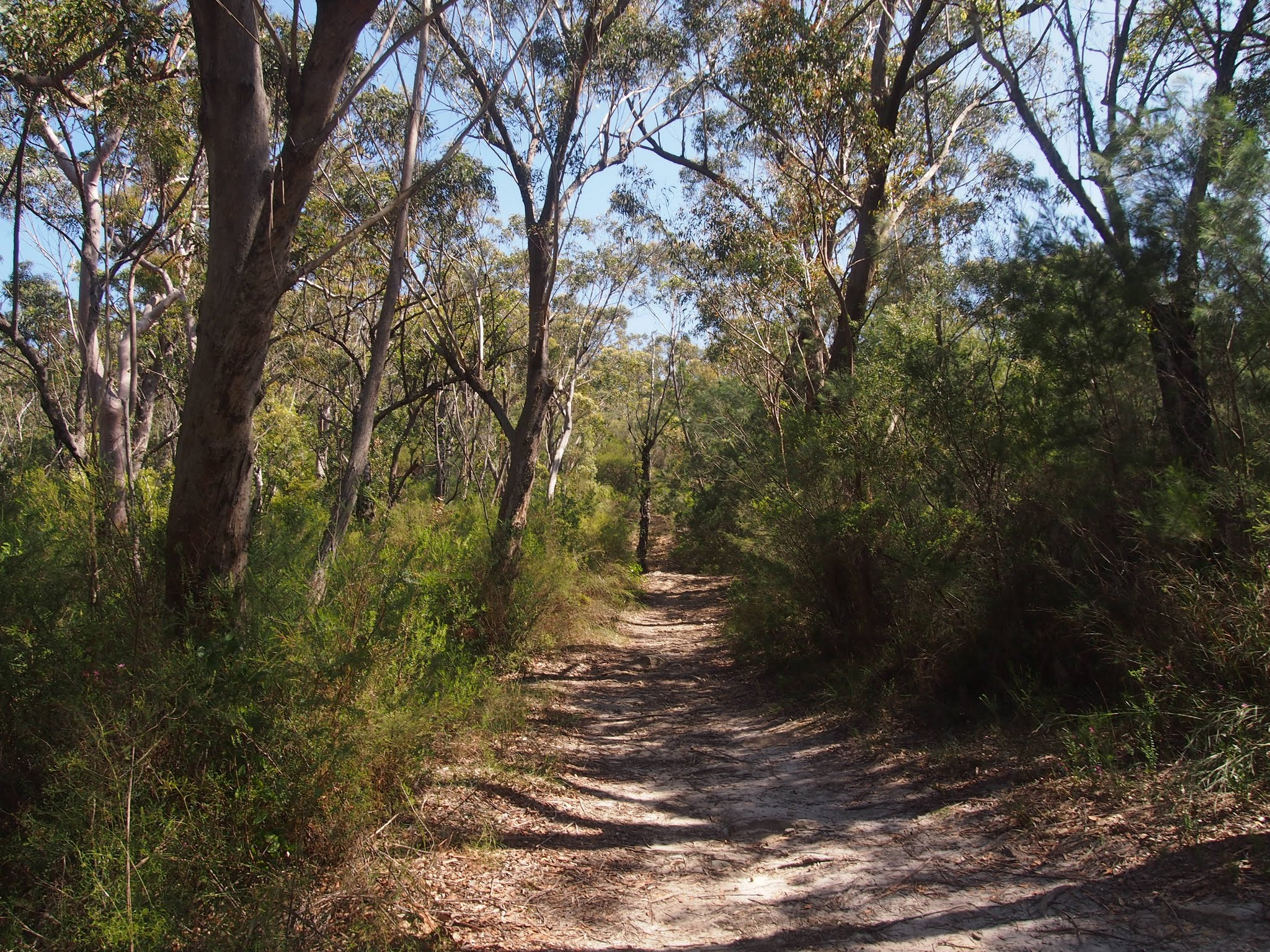
Winifred Falls Track (#8)

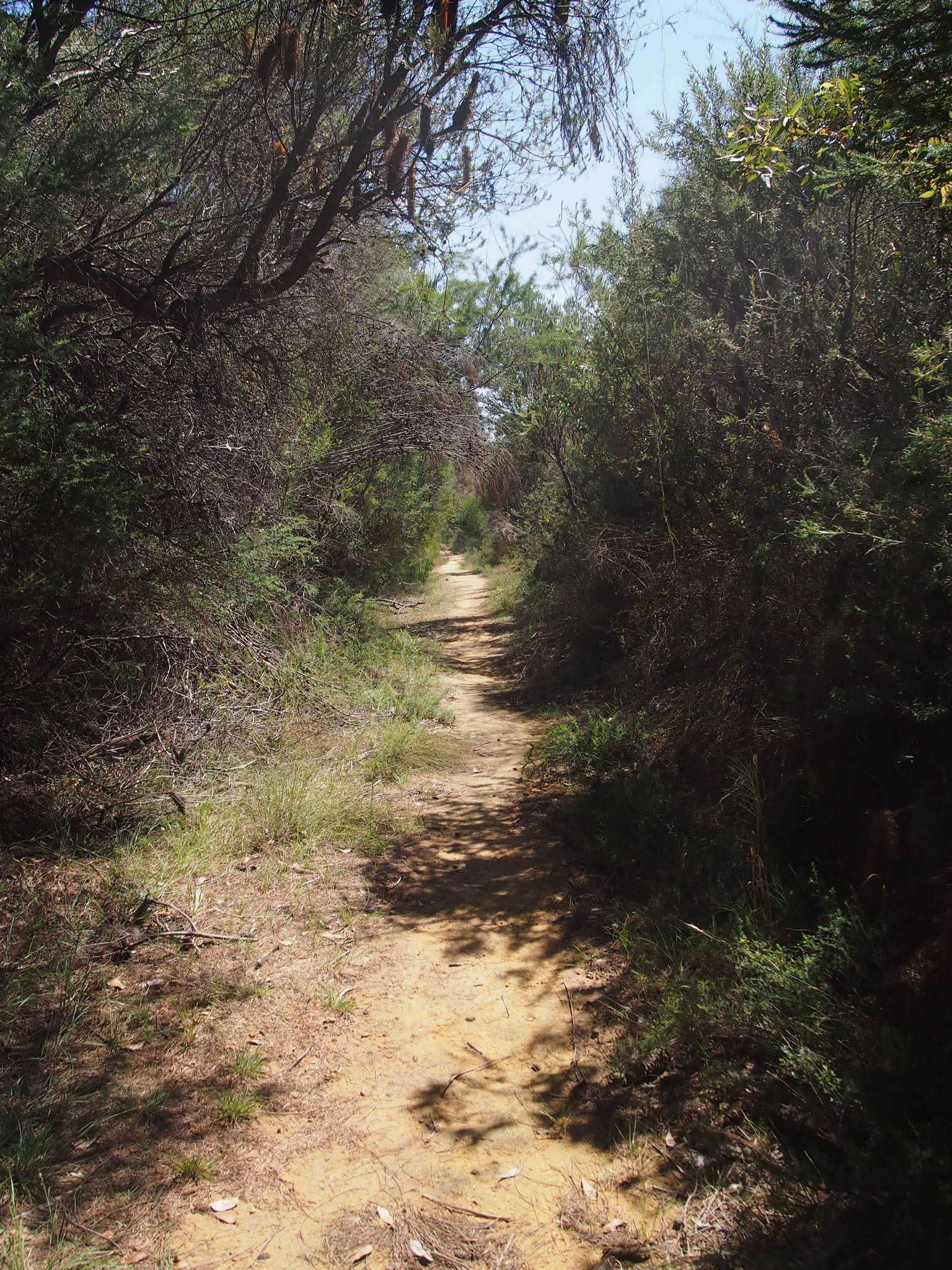
Winifred Falls Track (#9)

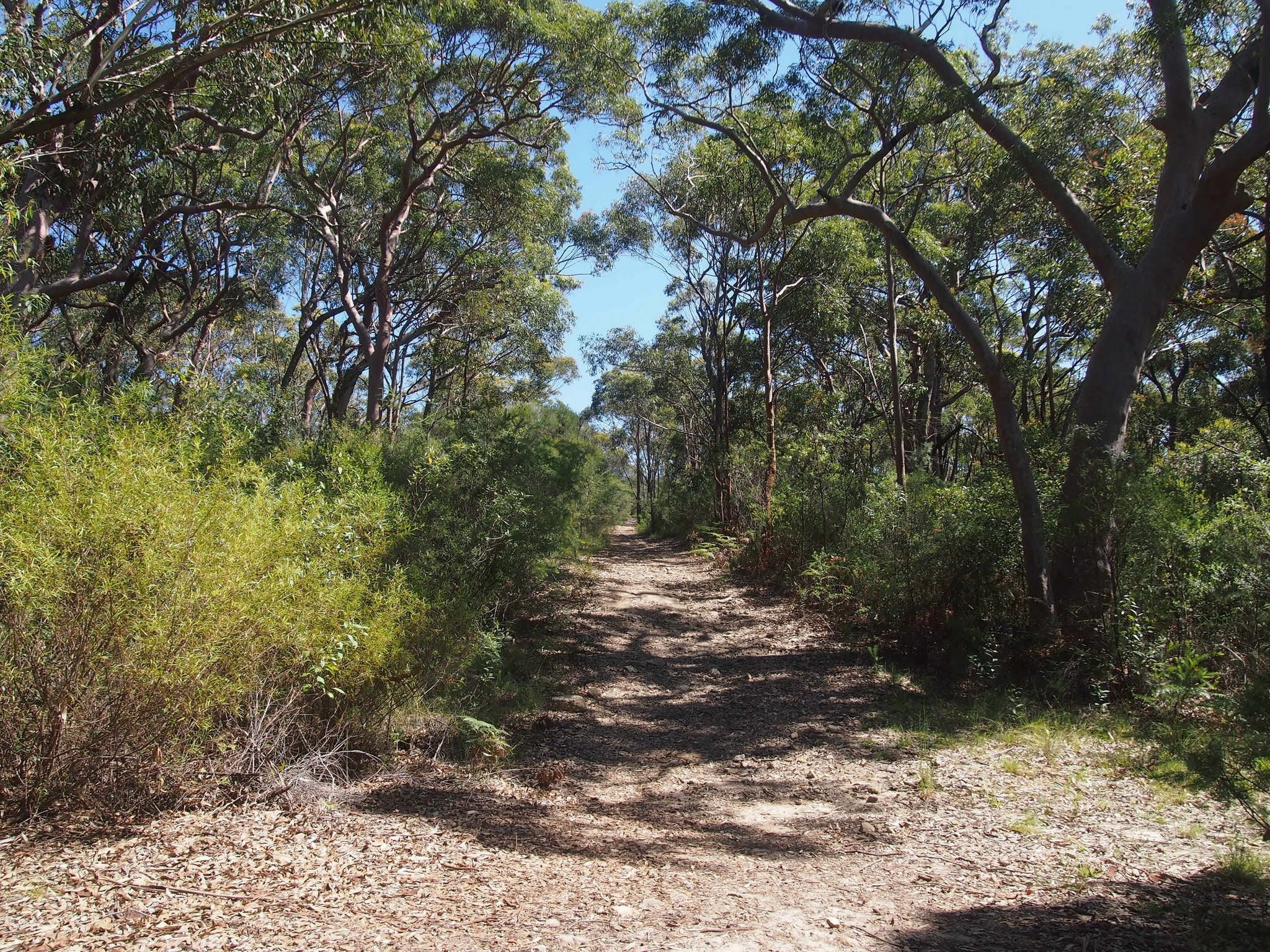
Winifred Falls Track (#10)

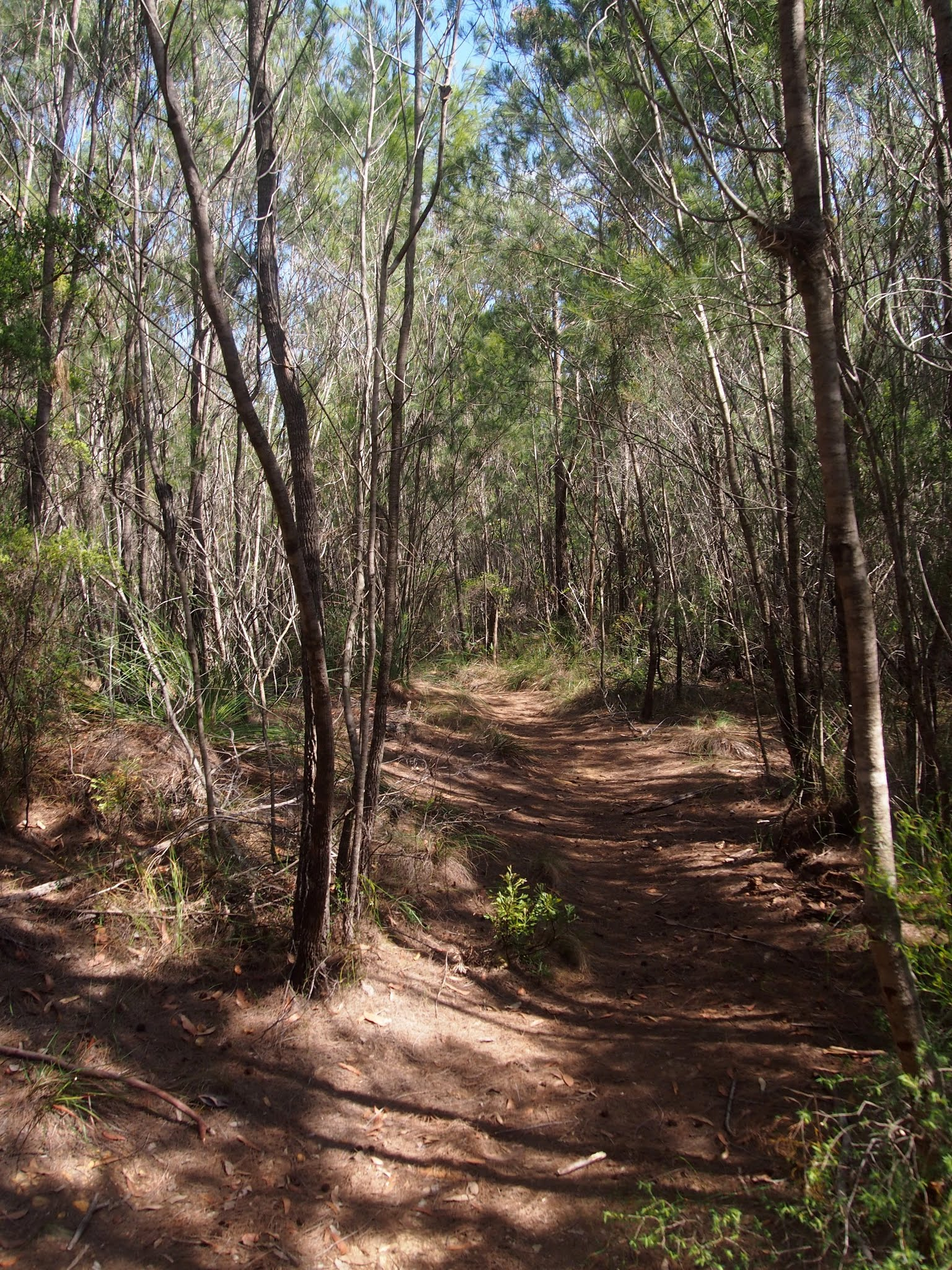
Winifred Falls Track (#11)

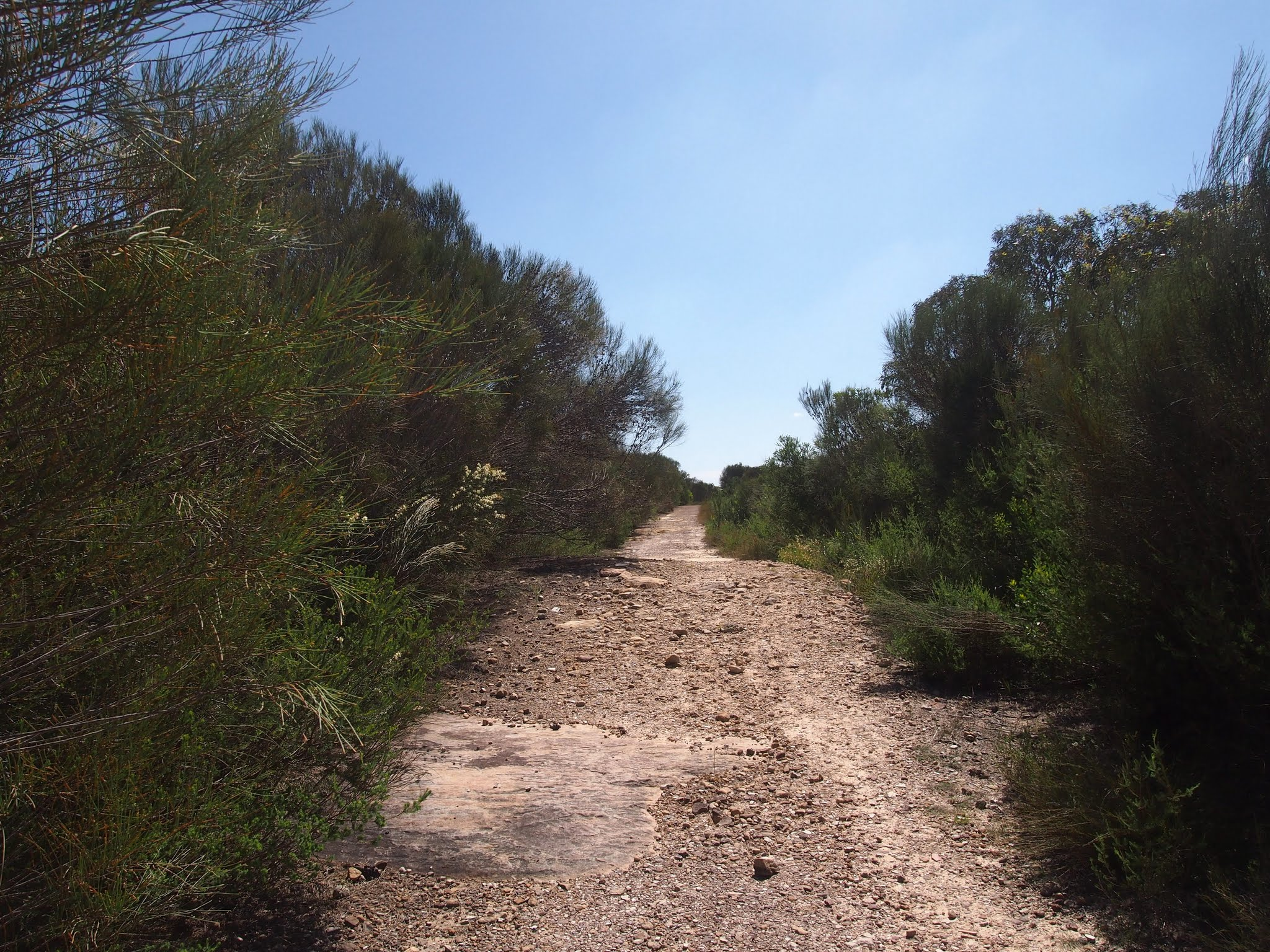
Winifred Falls Track (#12)

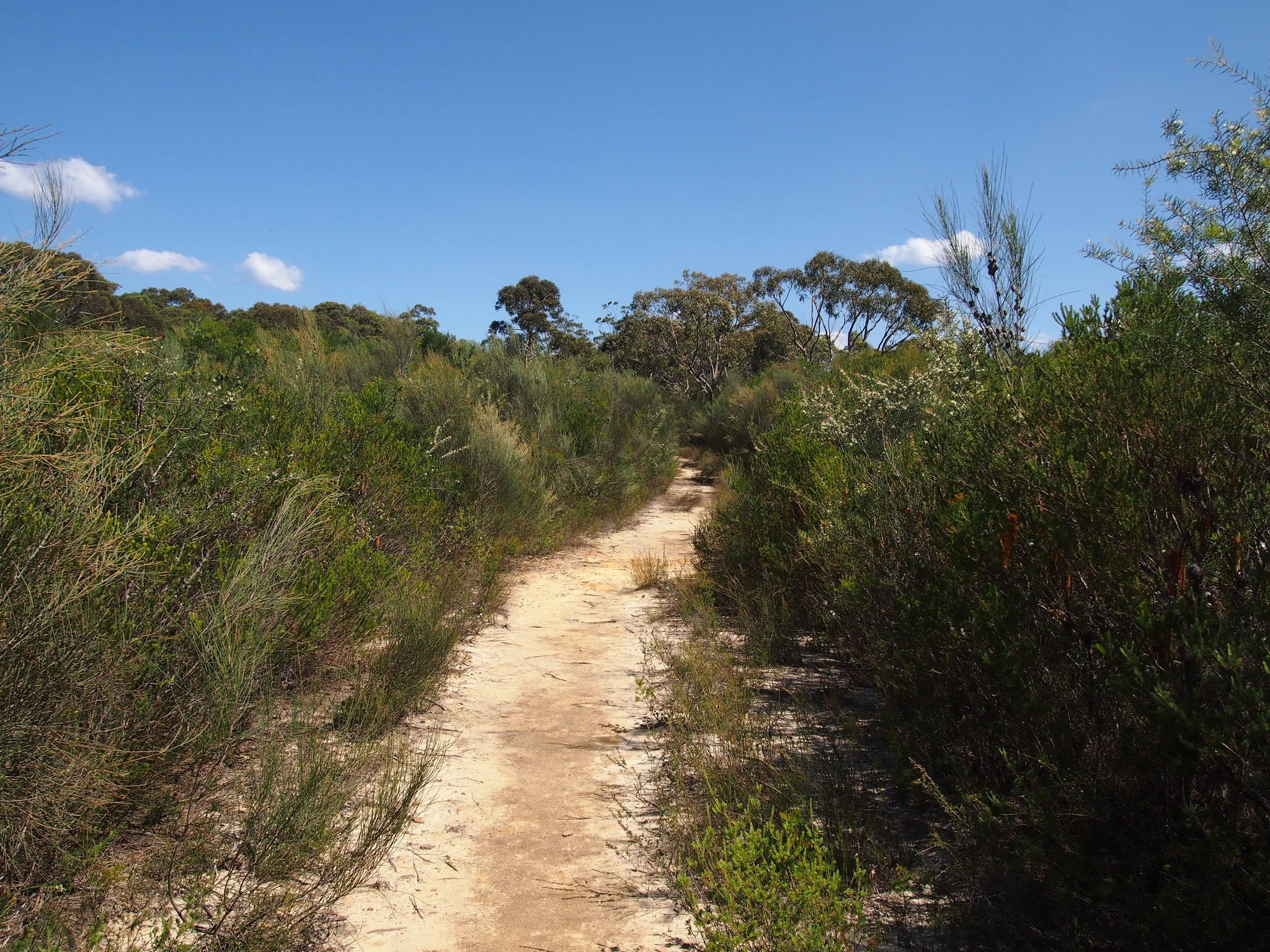
Winifred Falls Track (#13)

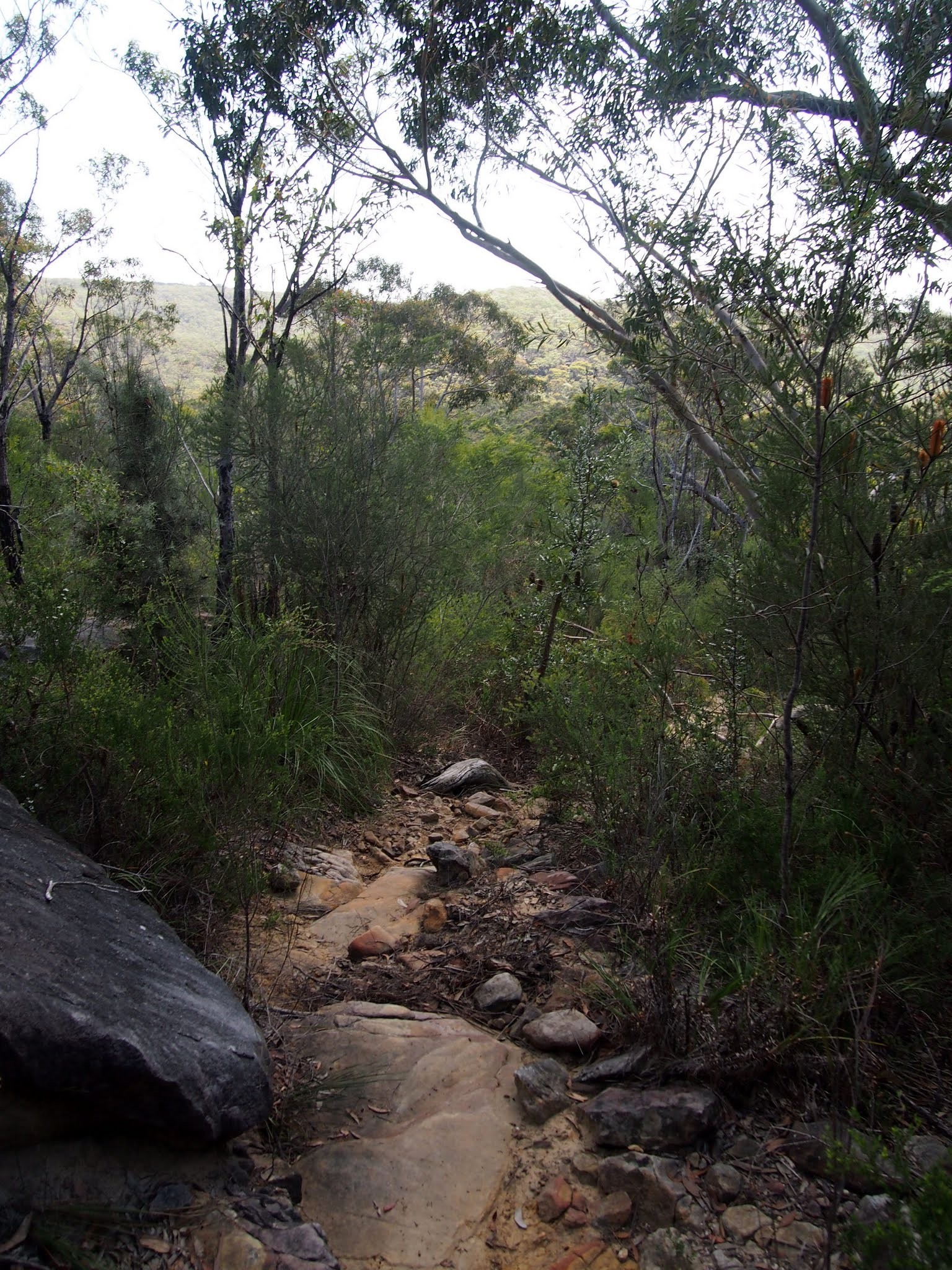
Winifred Falls Track (#14)

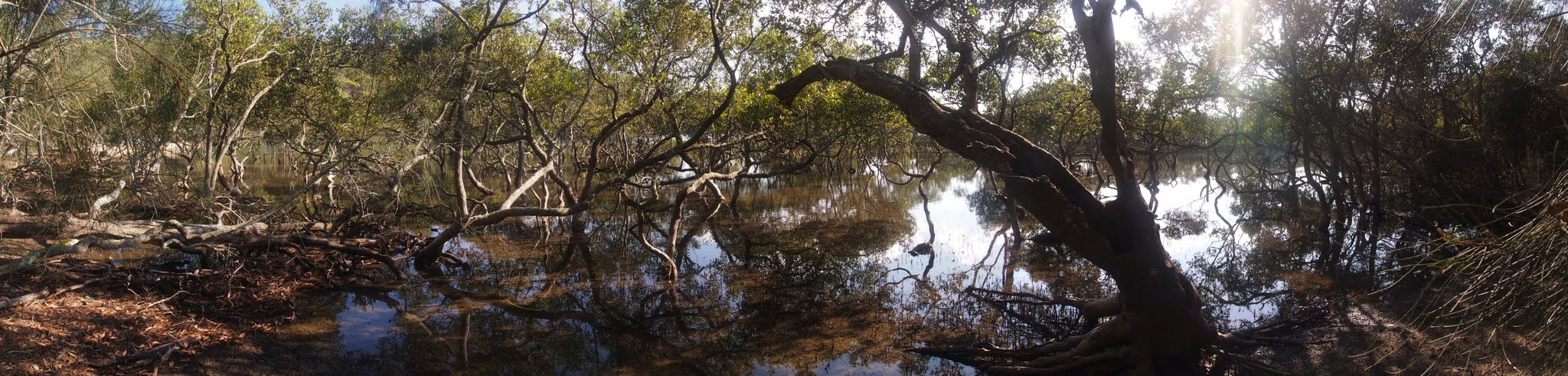
Bonnie Vale (#1)

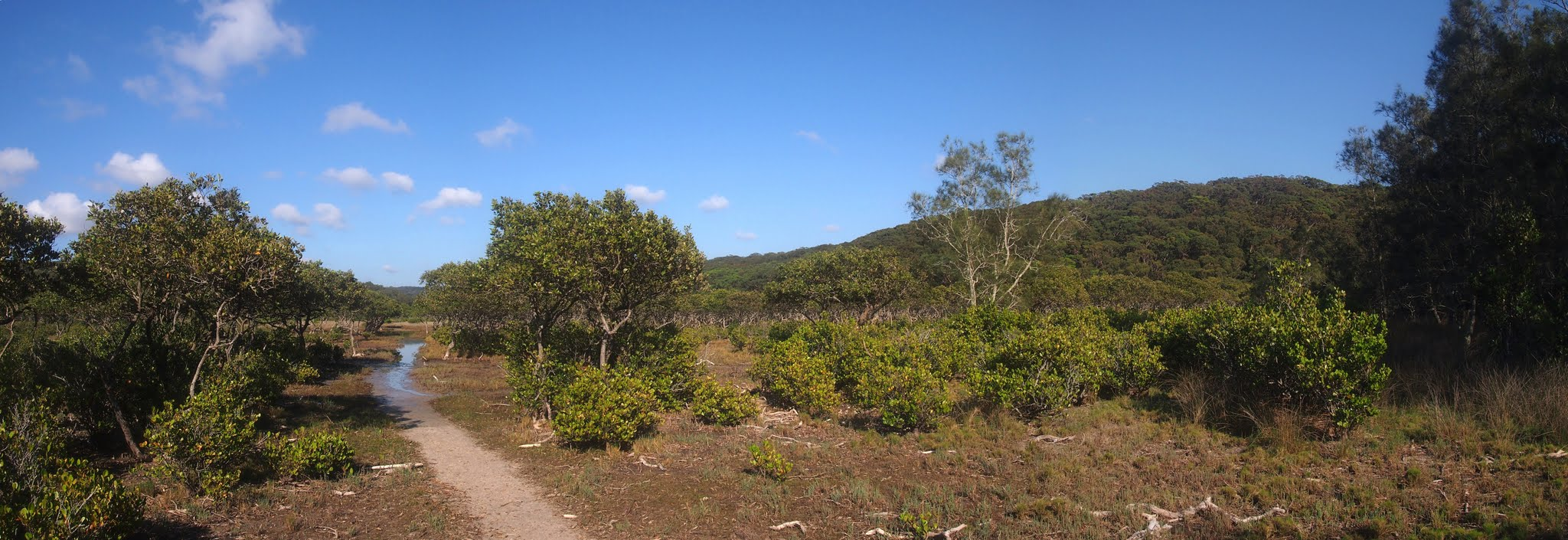
Bonnie Vale (#2)

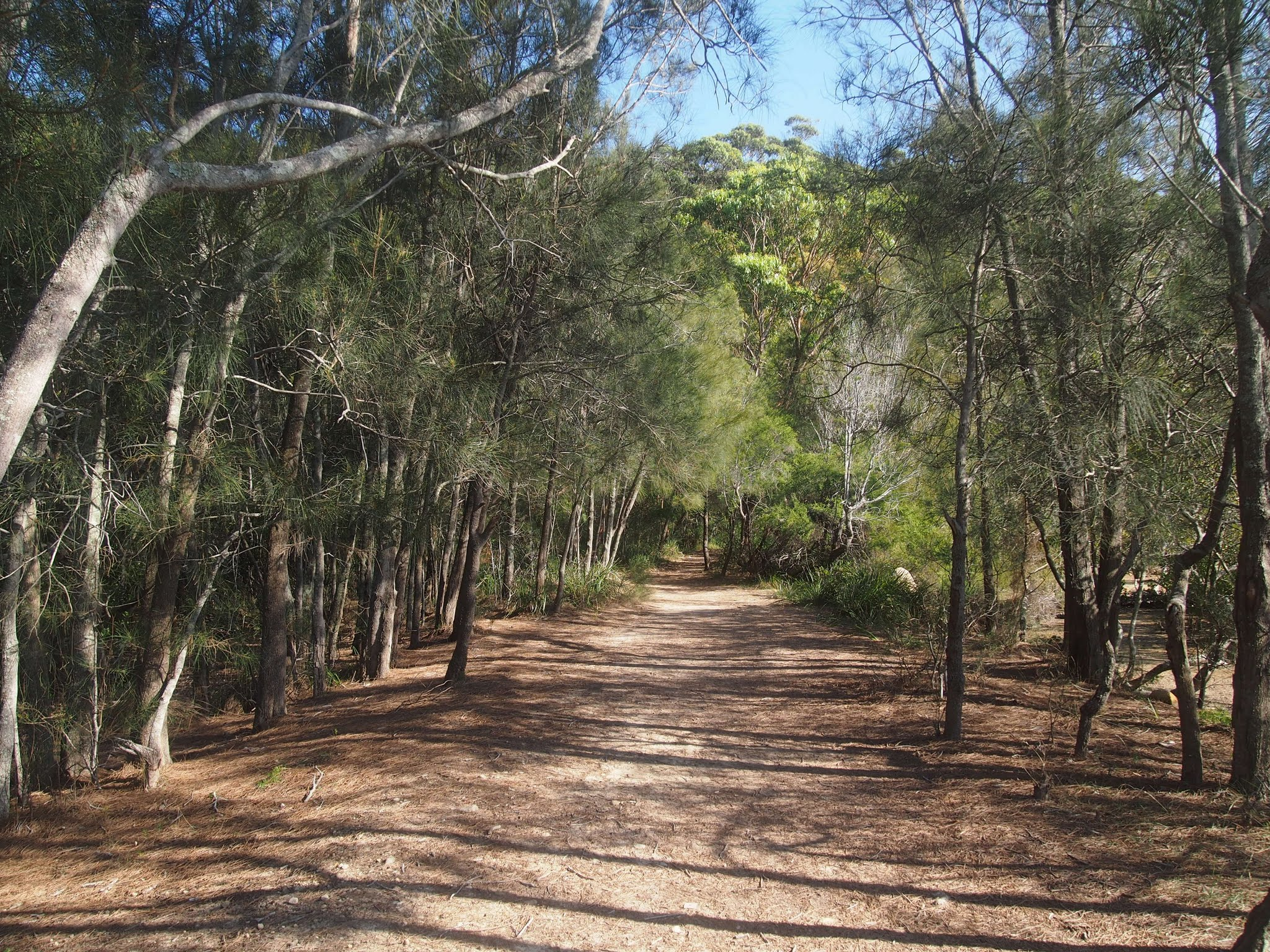
Bonnie Vale (#3)

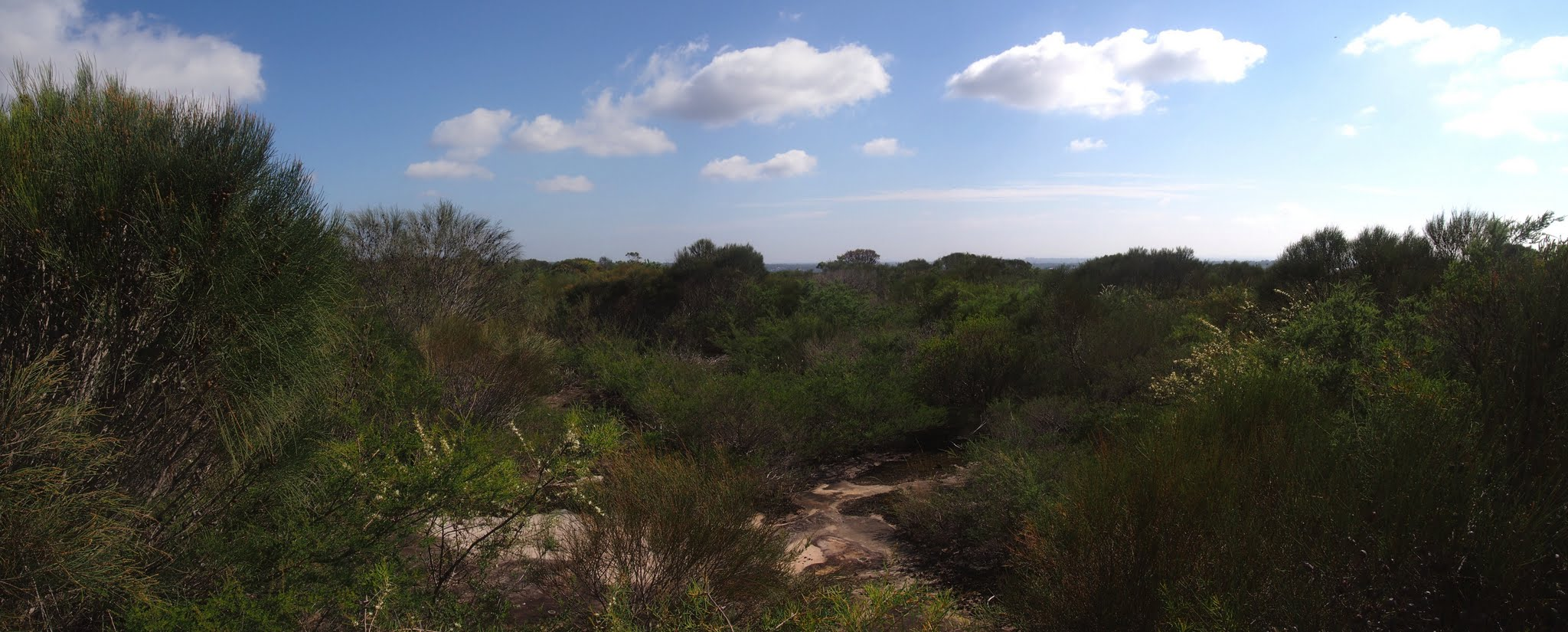
Maianbar Road

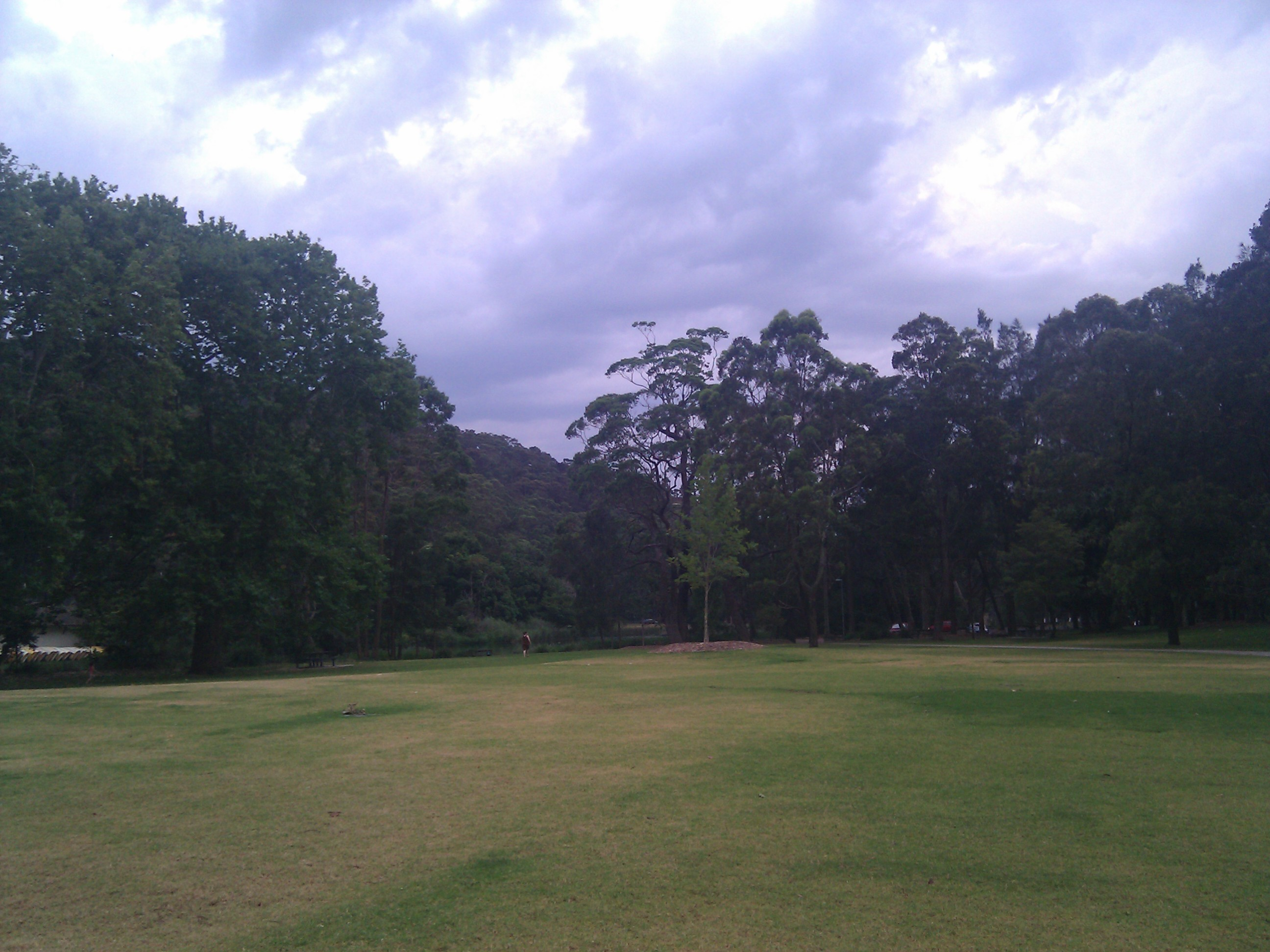
Audley NSW 2232, Australia – Panorama #1

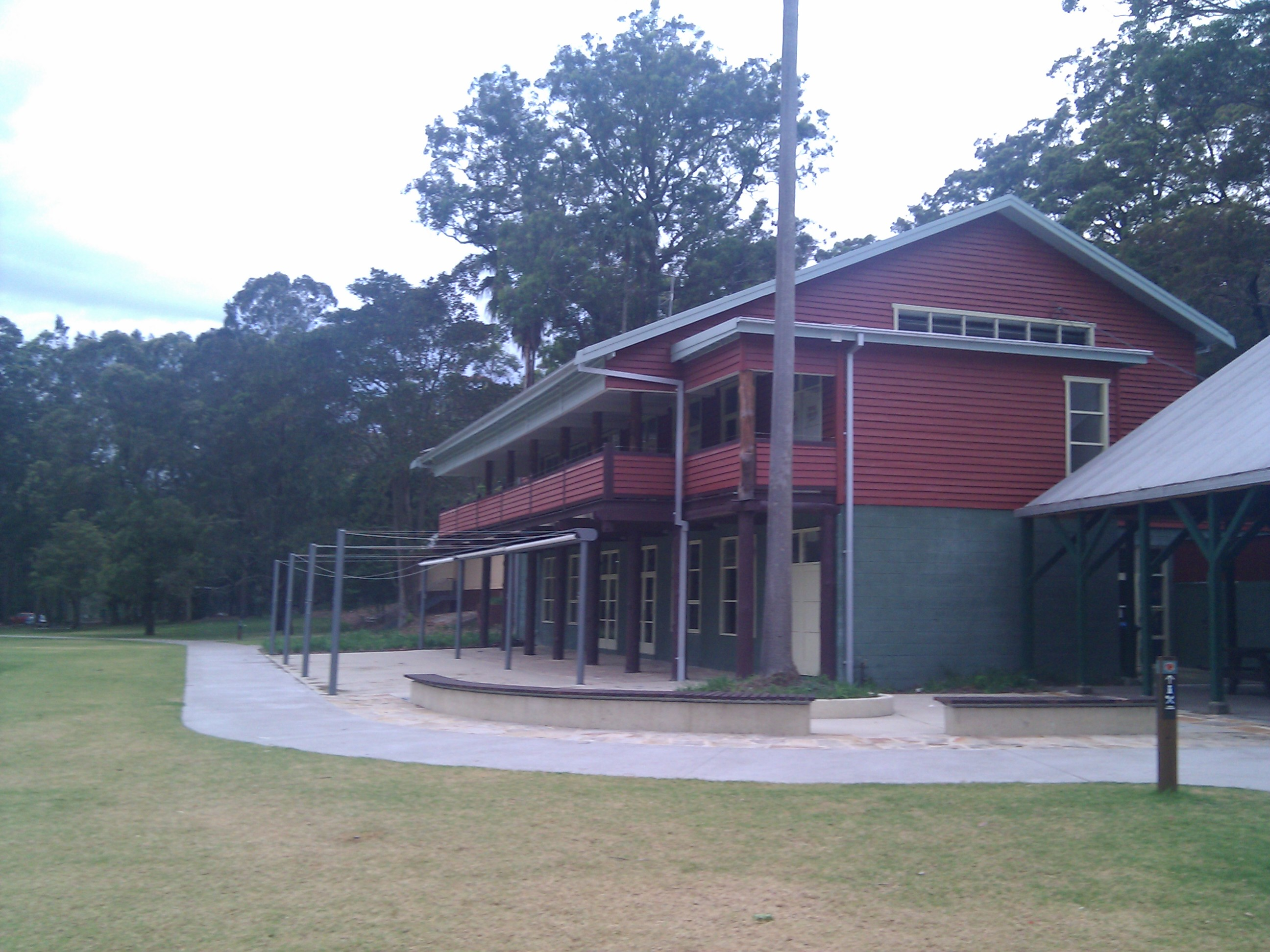
Audley NSW 2232, Australia – Panorama #2

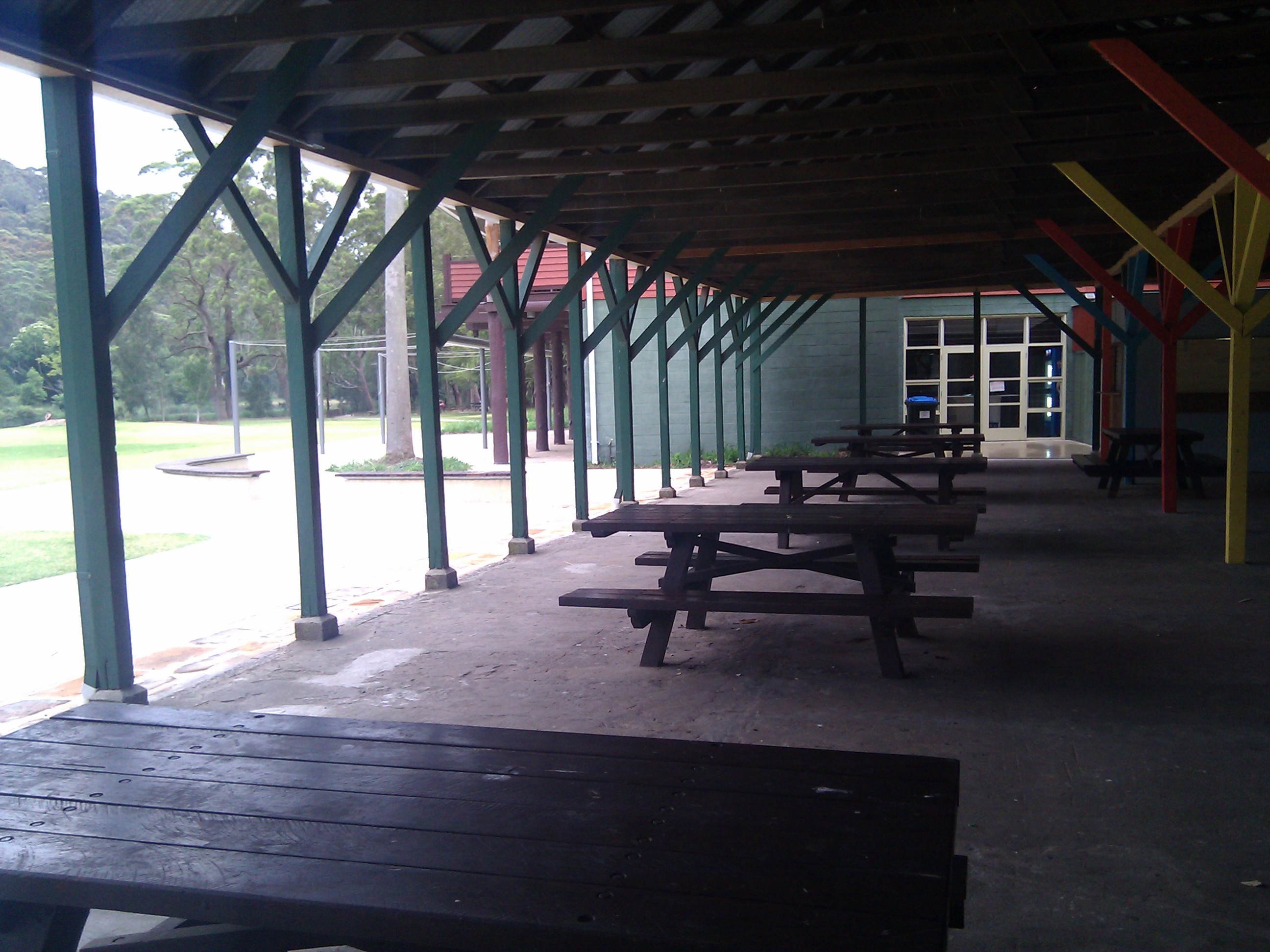
Audley NSW 2232, Australia – Panorama #3

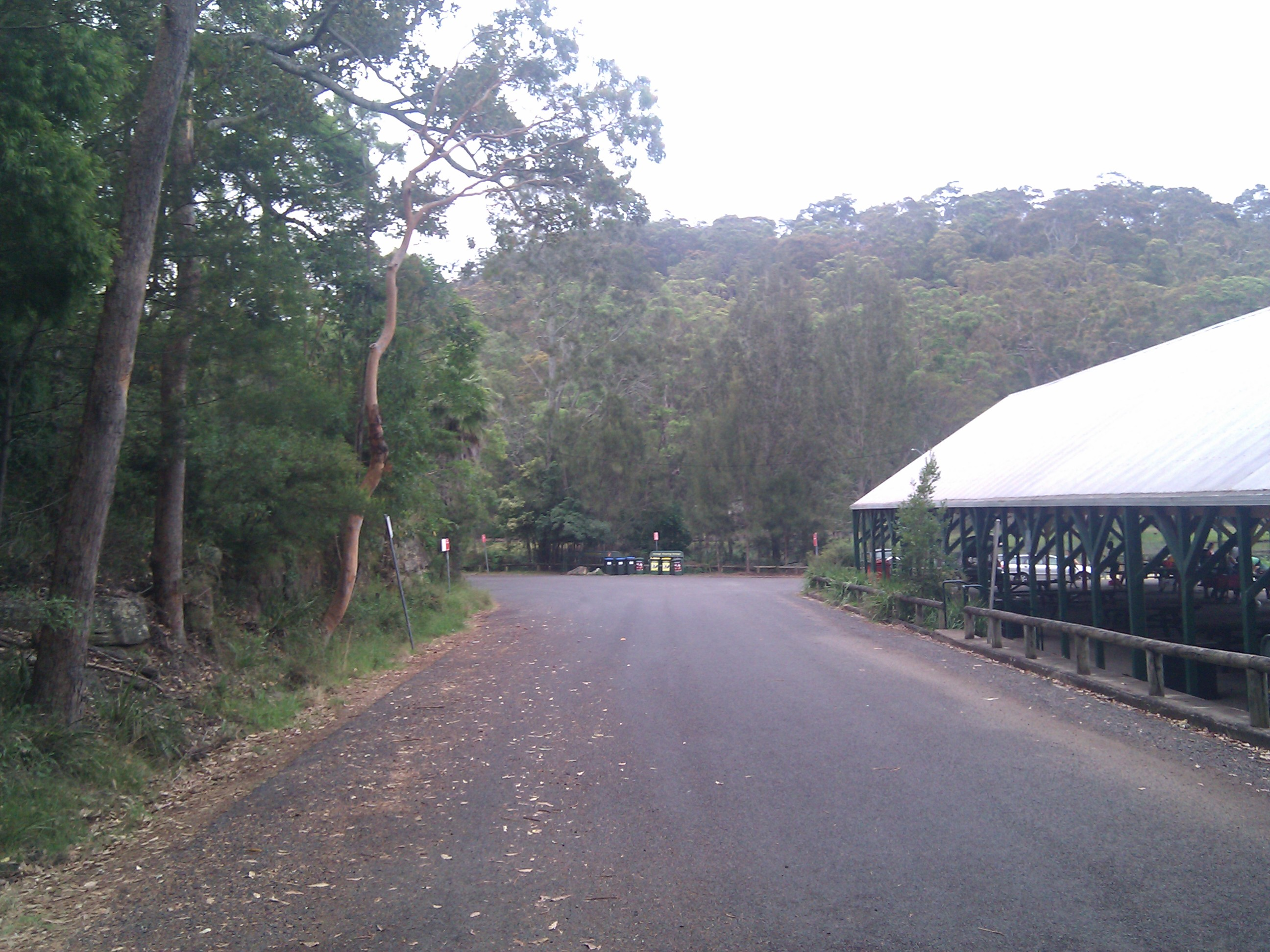
Audley NSW 2232, Australia – Panorama #4

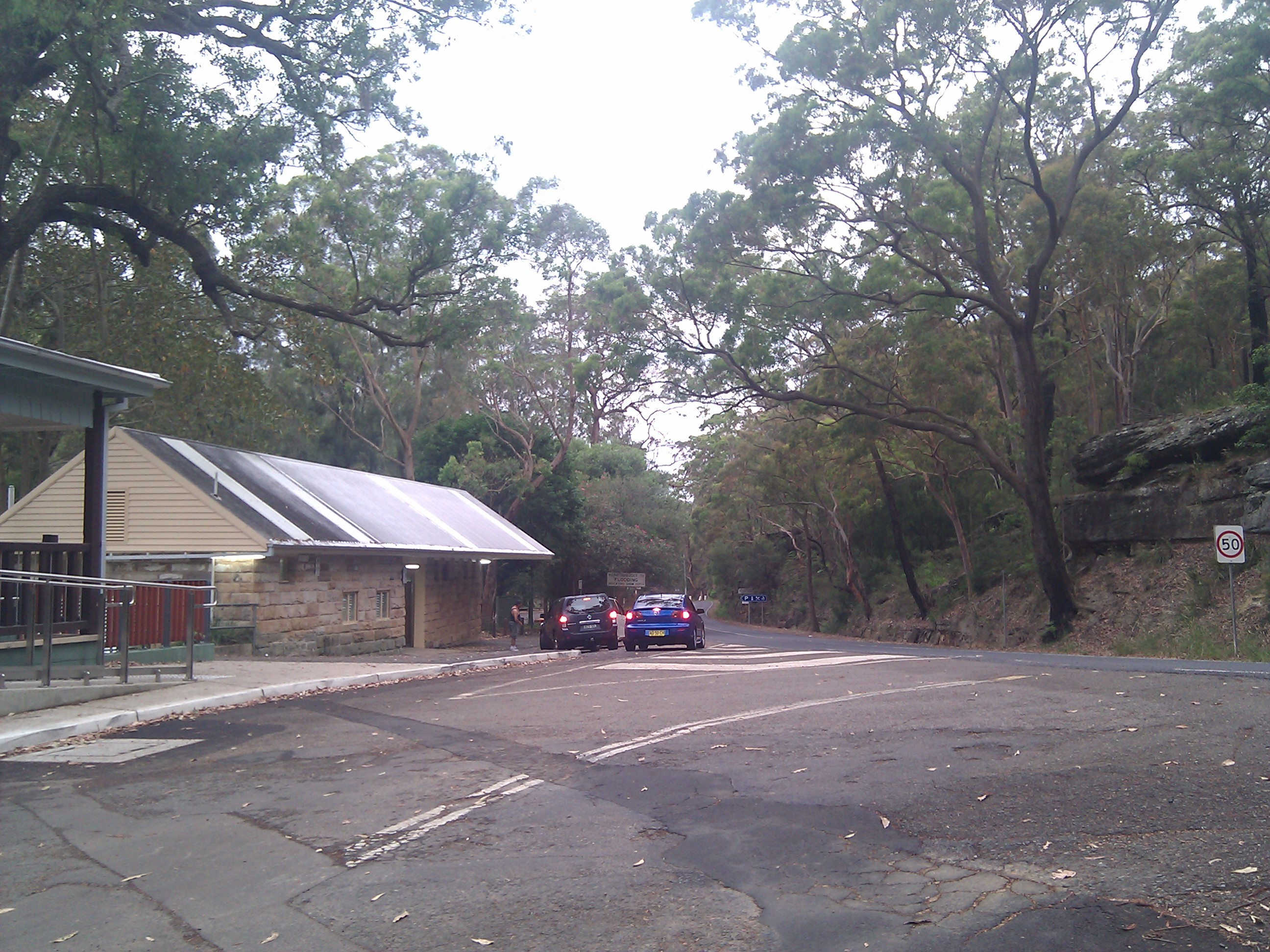
Audley NSW 2232, Australia – Panorama #5

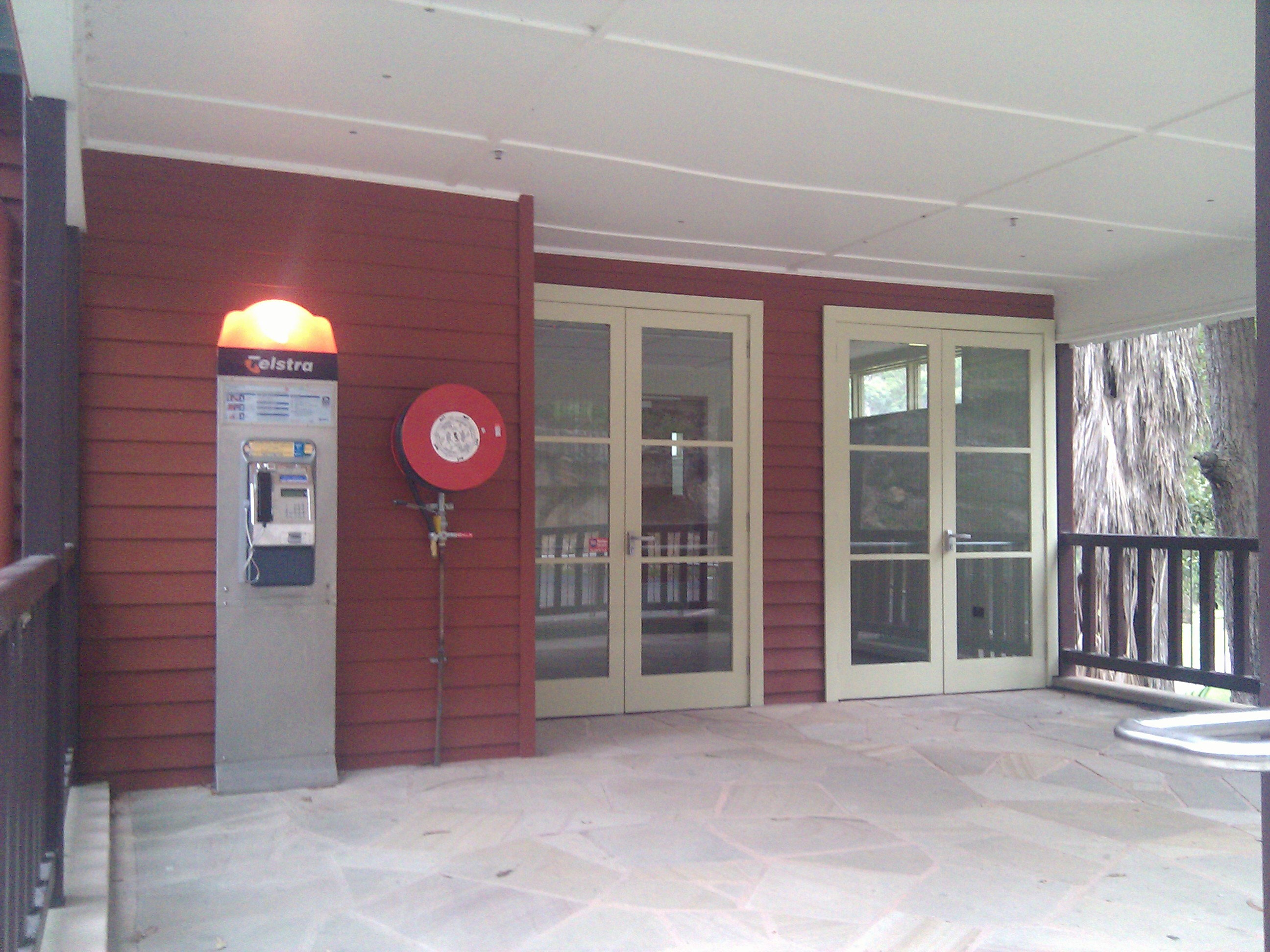
Audley NSW 2232, Australia – Panorama #6

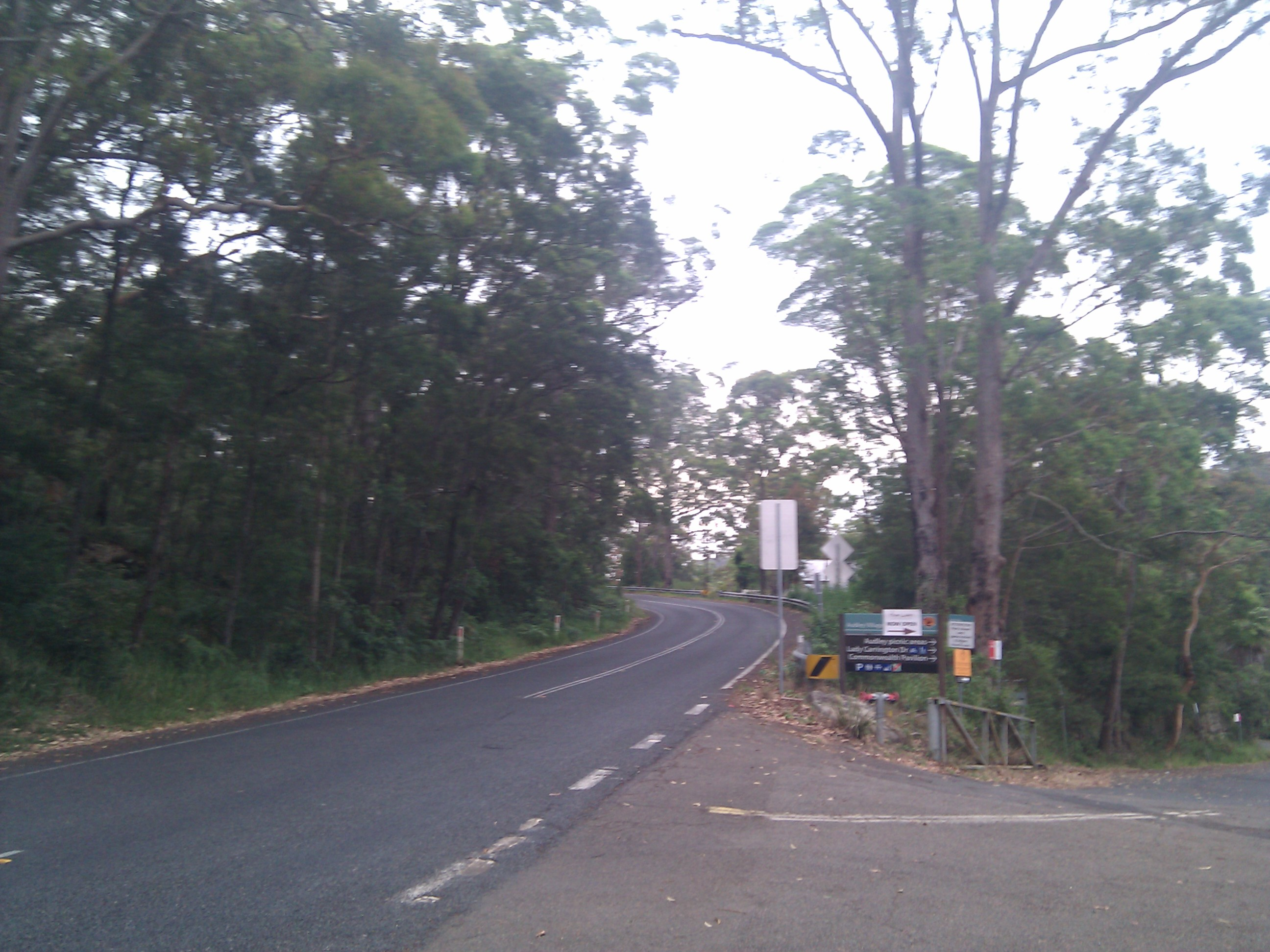
Audley NSW 2232, Australia – Panorama #7

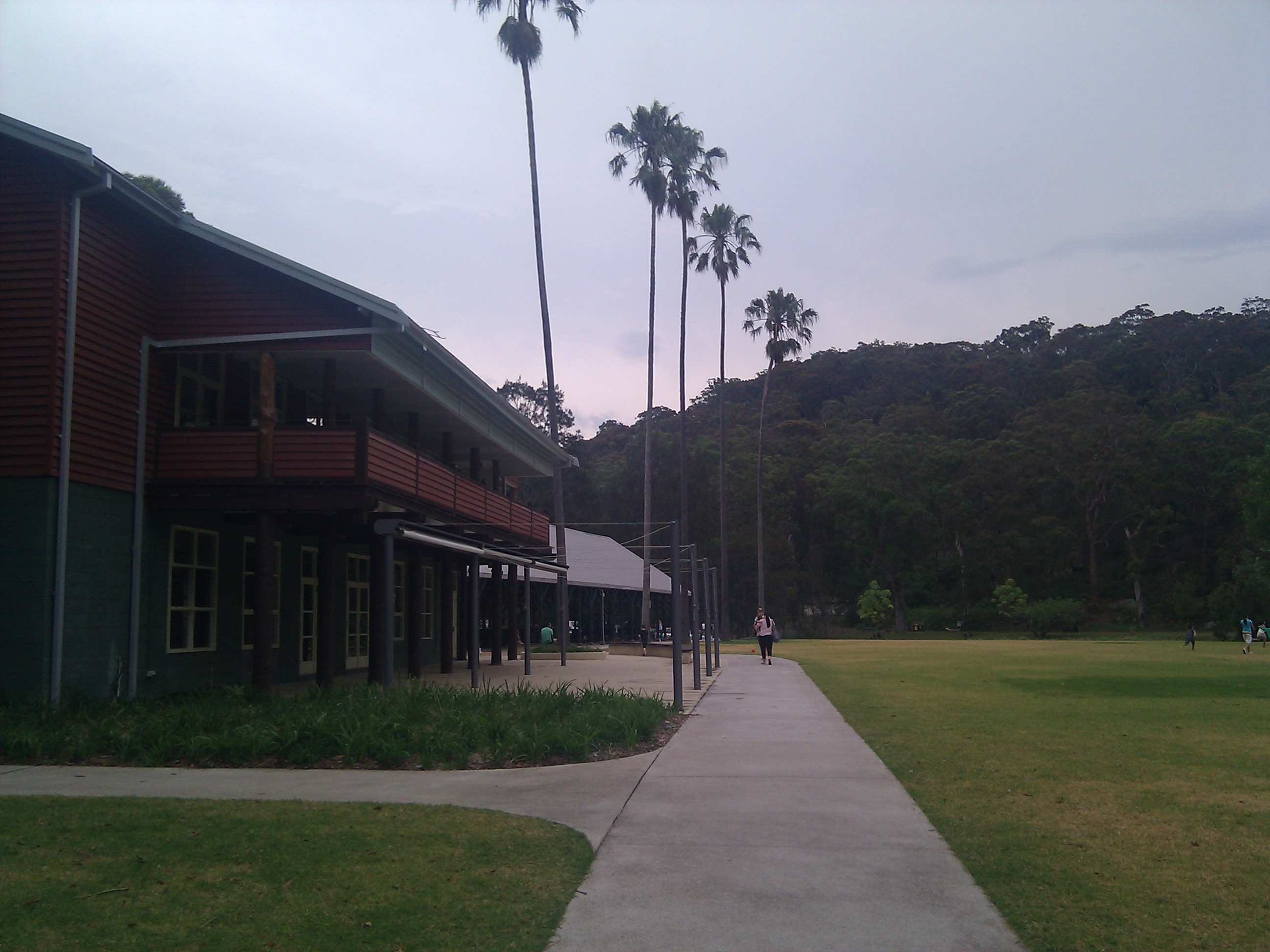
Audley NSW 2232, Australia – Panorama #8

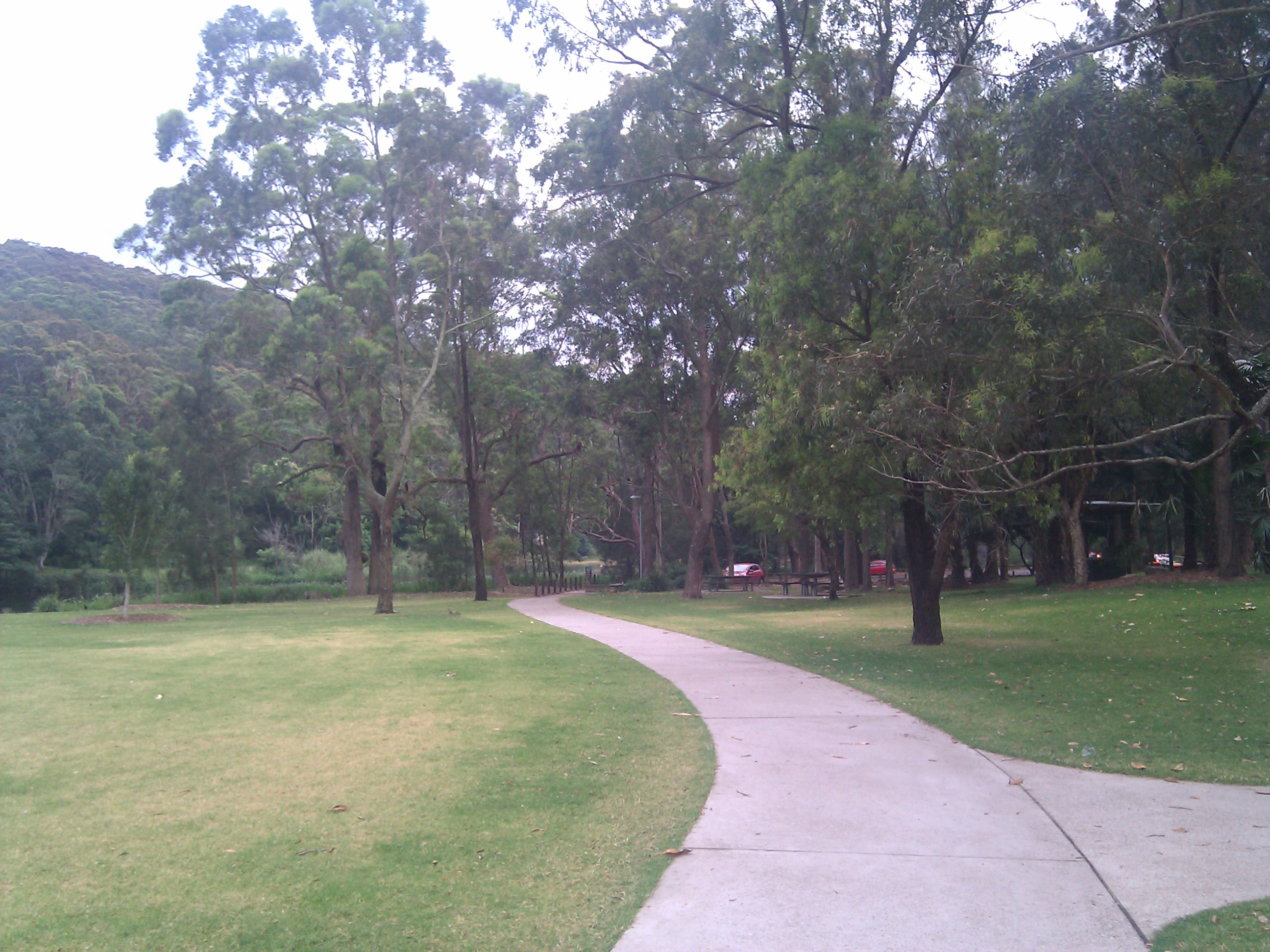
Audley NSW 2232, Australia – Panorama #9

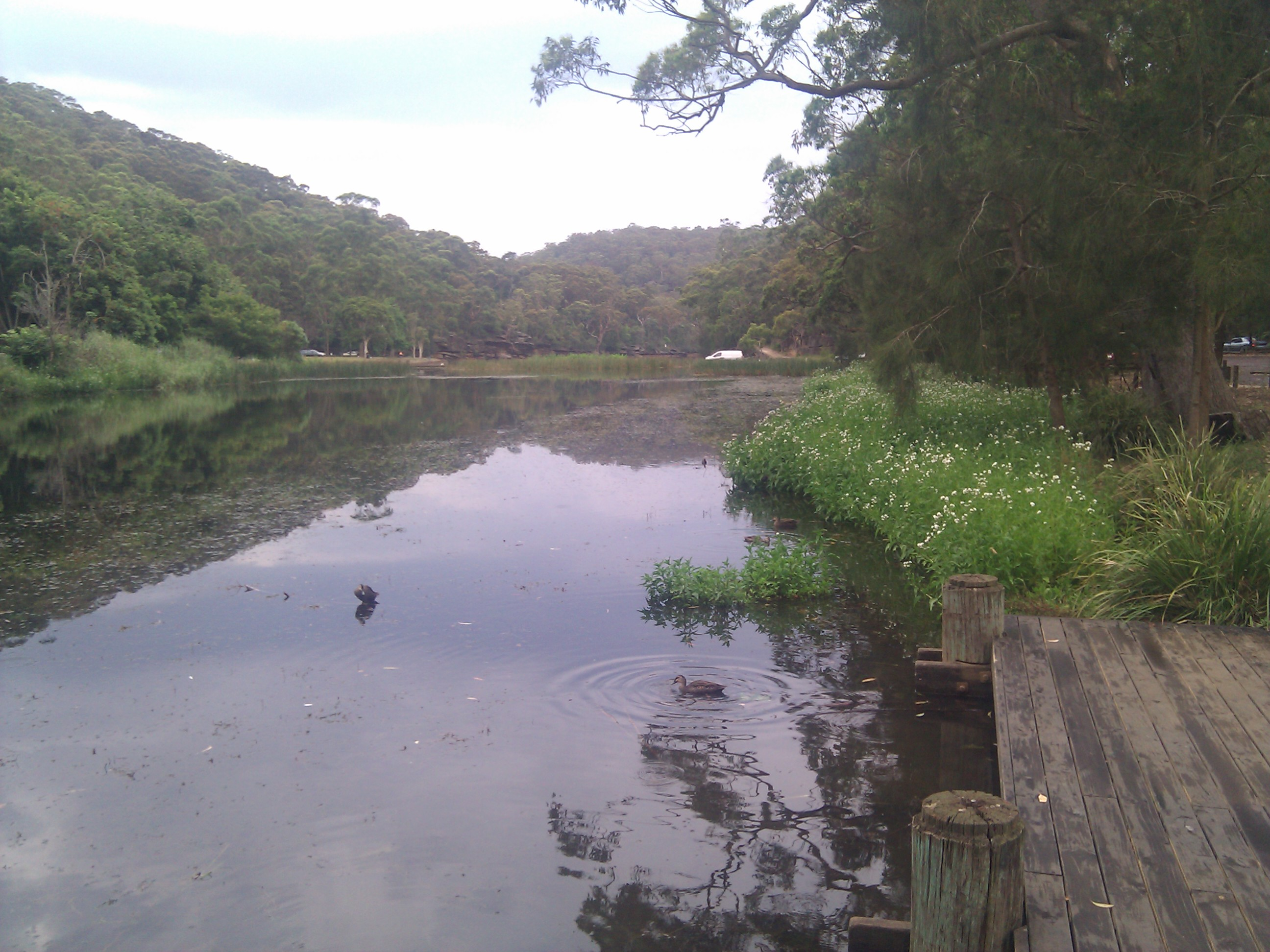
Audley NSW 2232, Australia – Panorama #10

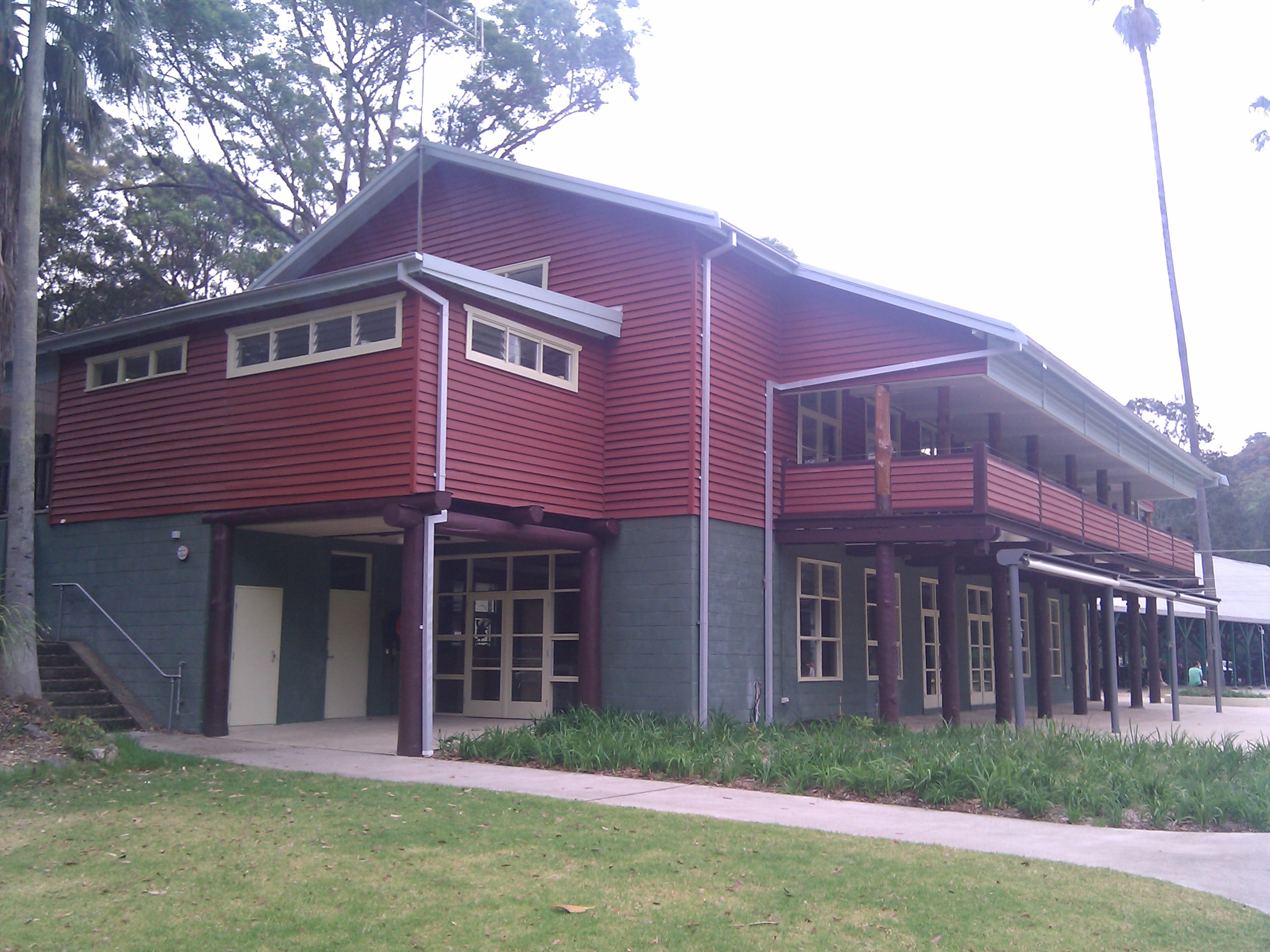
Audley NSW 2232, Australia – Panorama #11

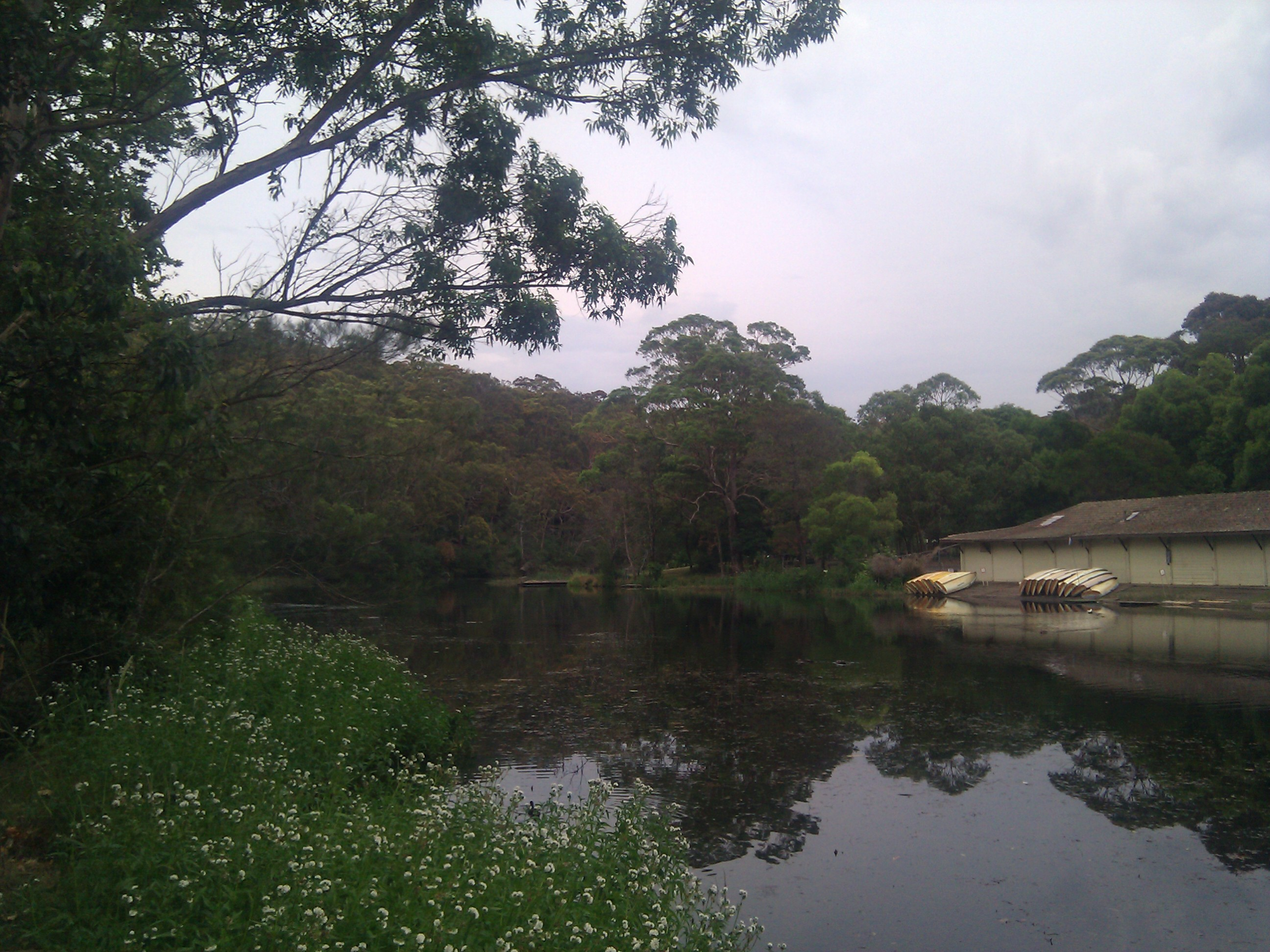
Audley NSW 2232, Australia – Panorama #12

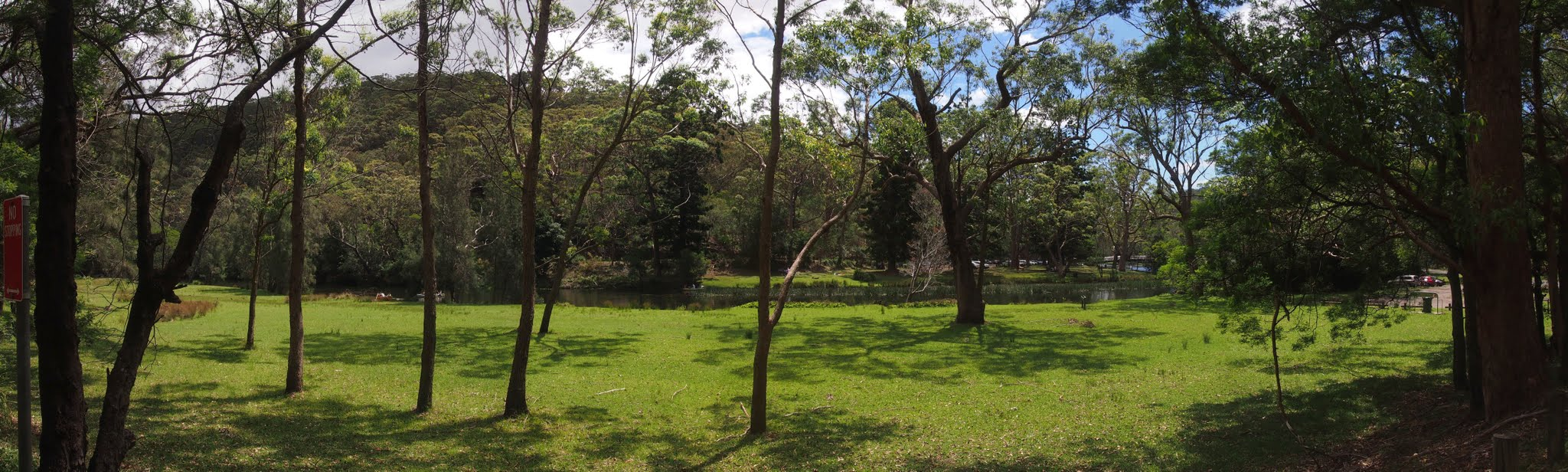
Audley NSW 2232, Australia – Panorama #13

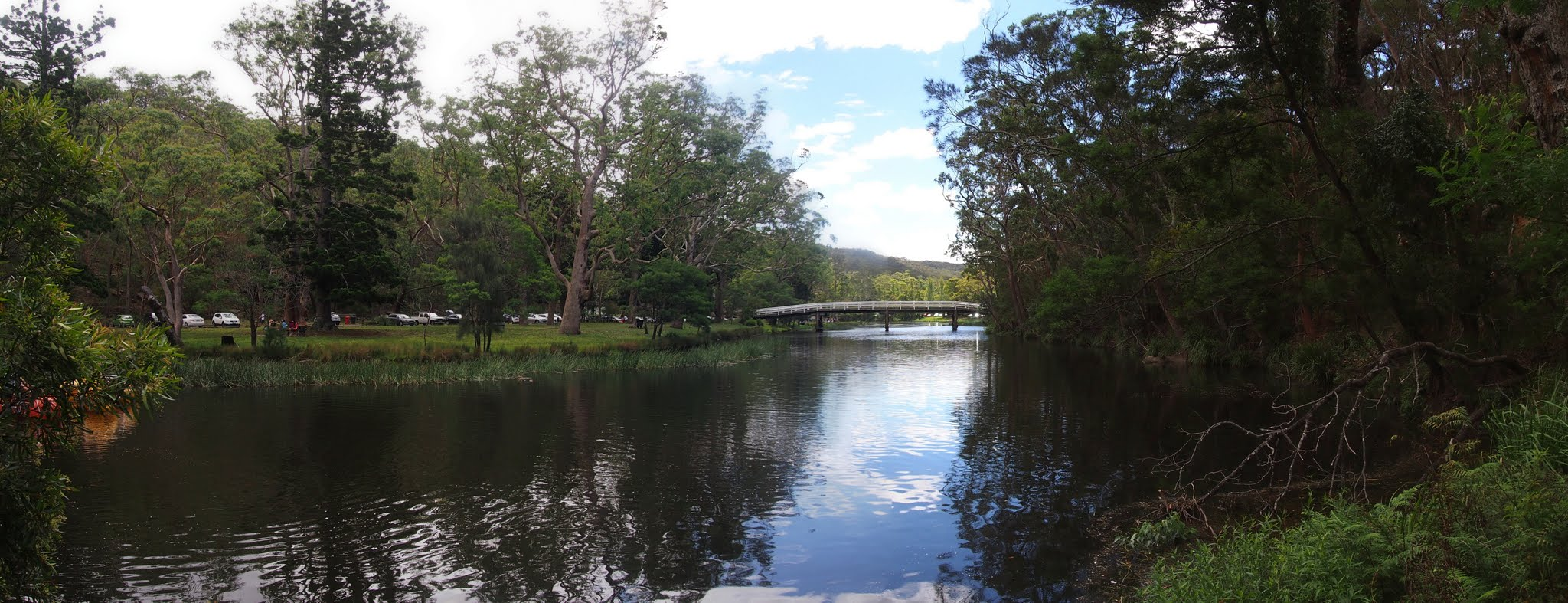
Audley NSW 2232, Australia – Panorama #14

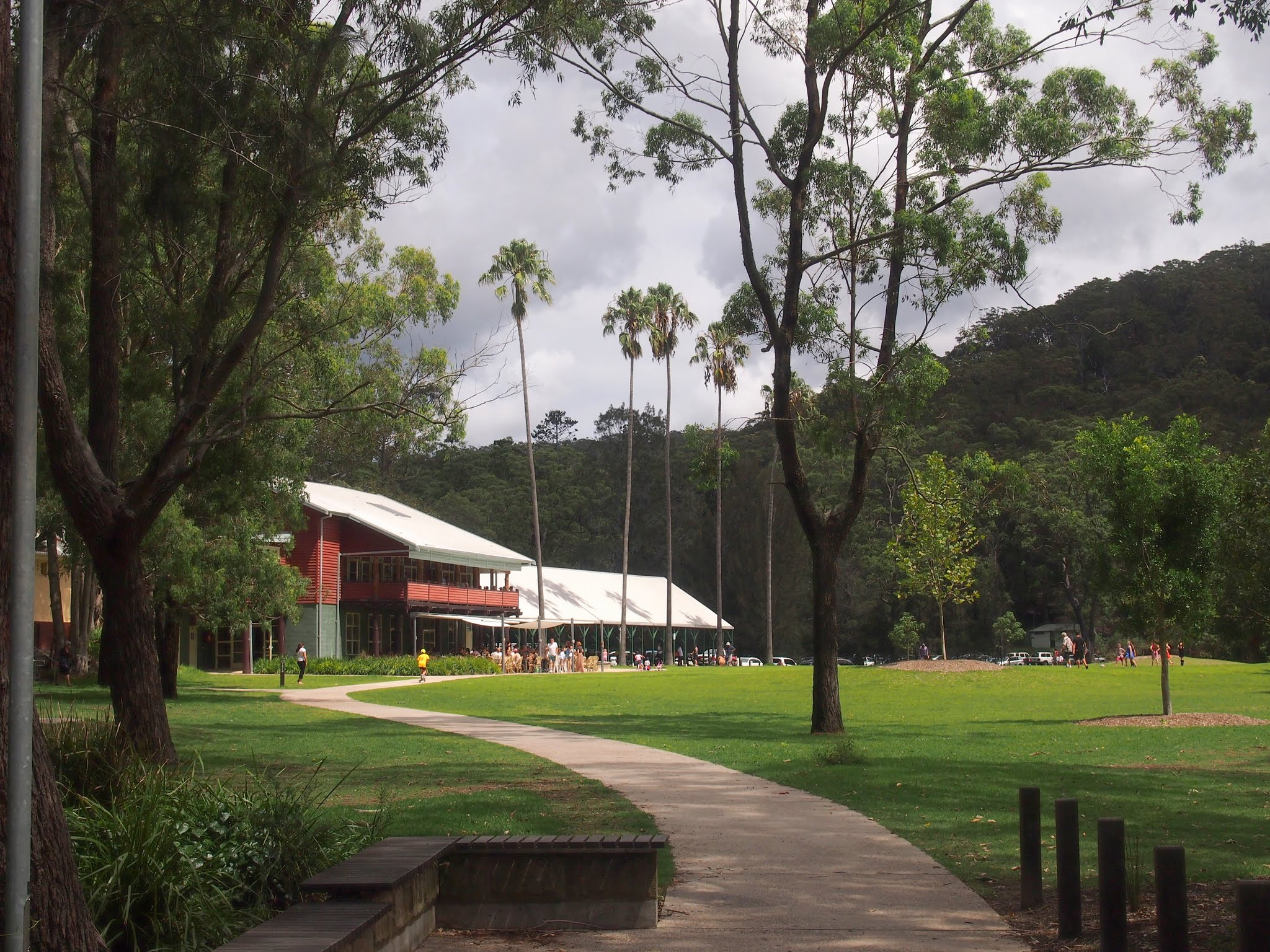
Audley NSW 2232, Australia – Panorama #15

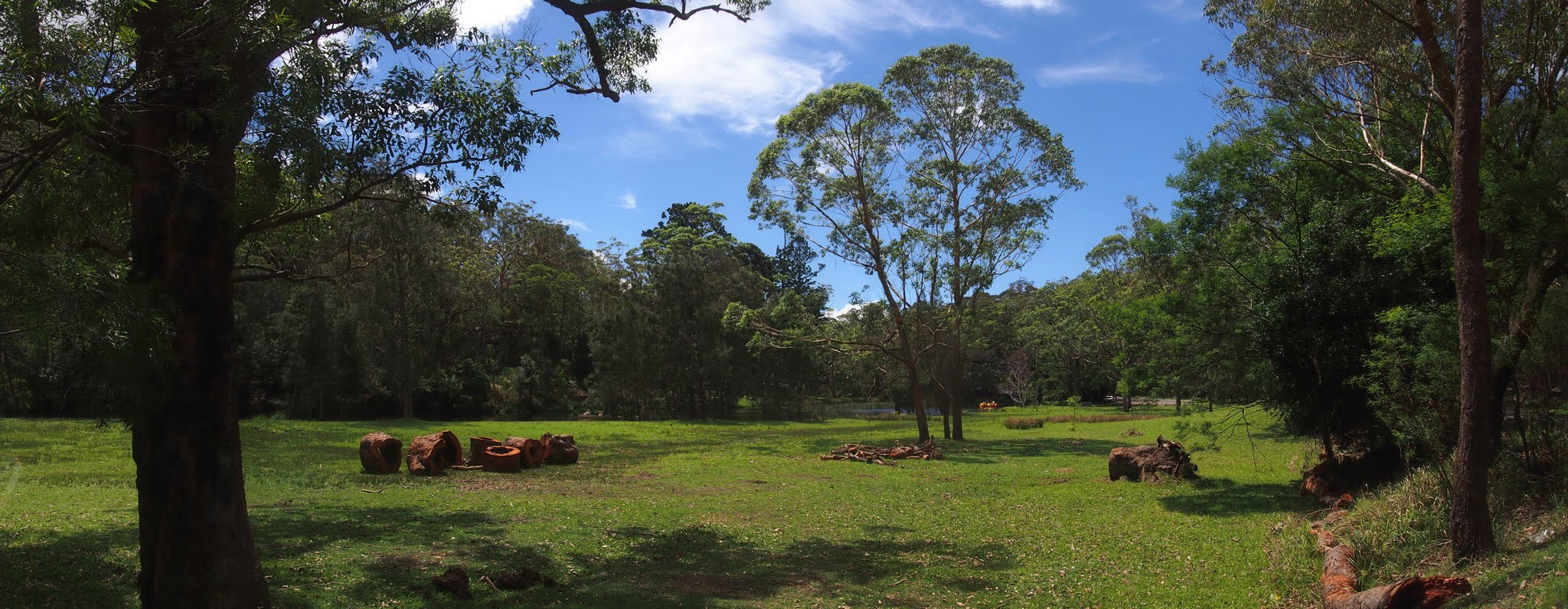
Audley NSW 2232, Australia – Panorama #16

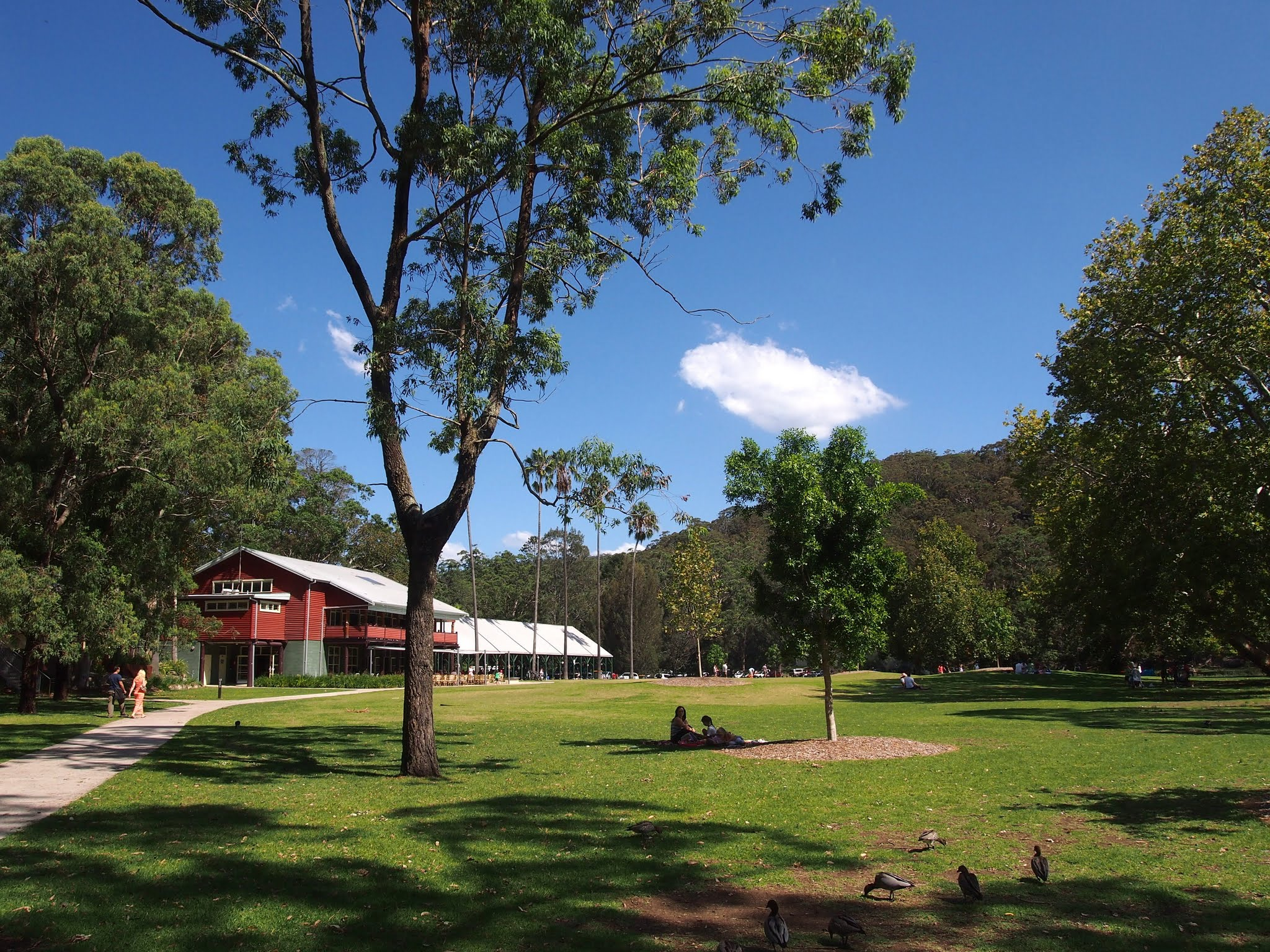
Audley NSW 2232, Australia – Panorama #17

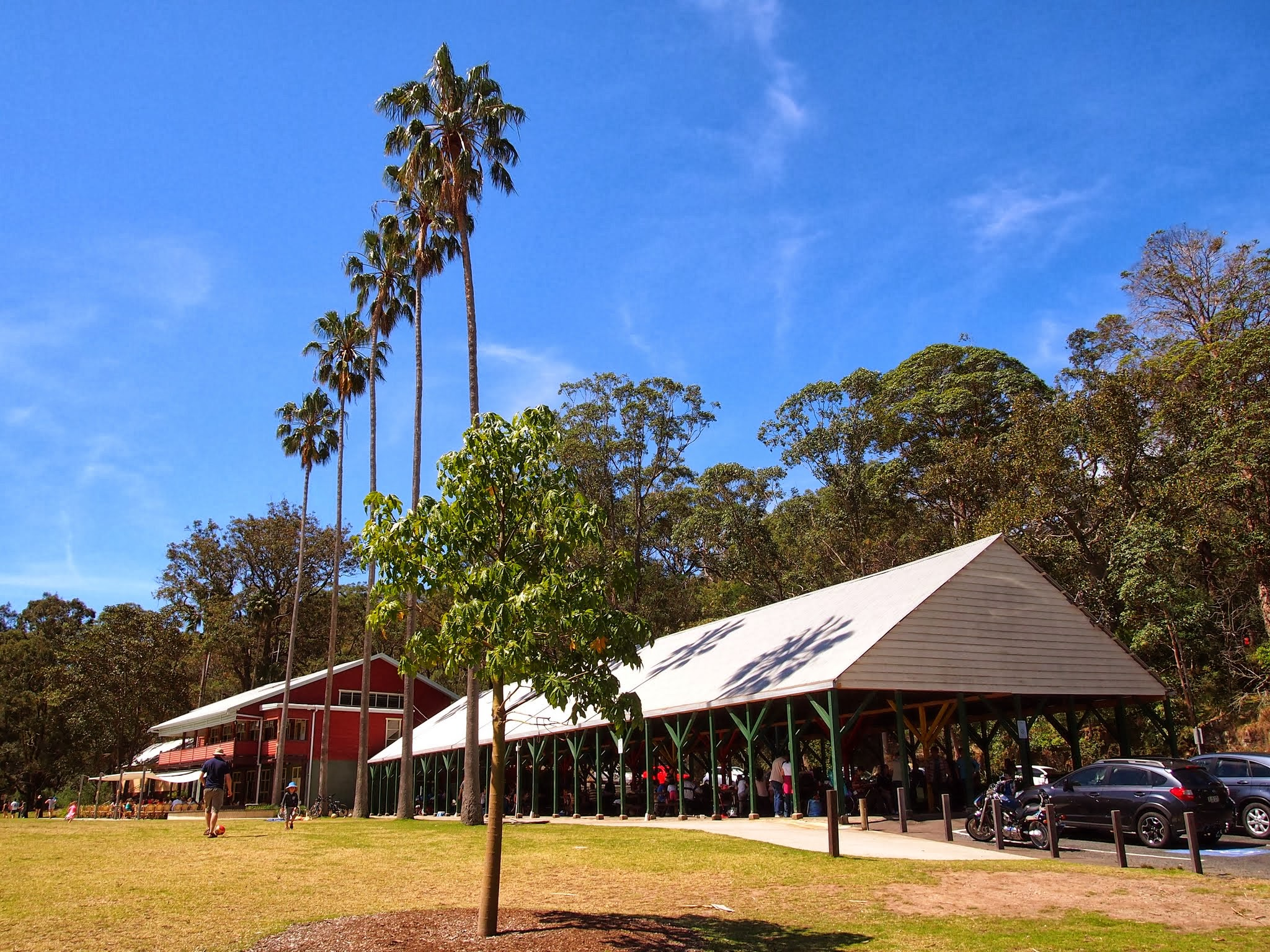
Audley NSW 2232, Australia – Panorama #18

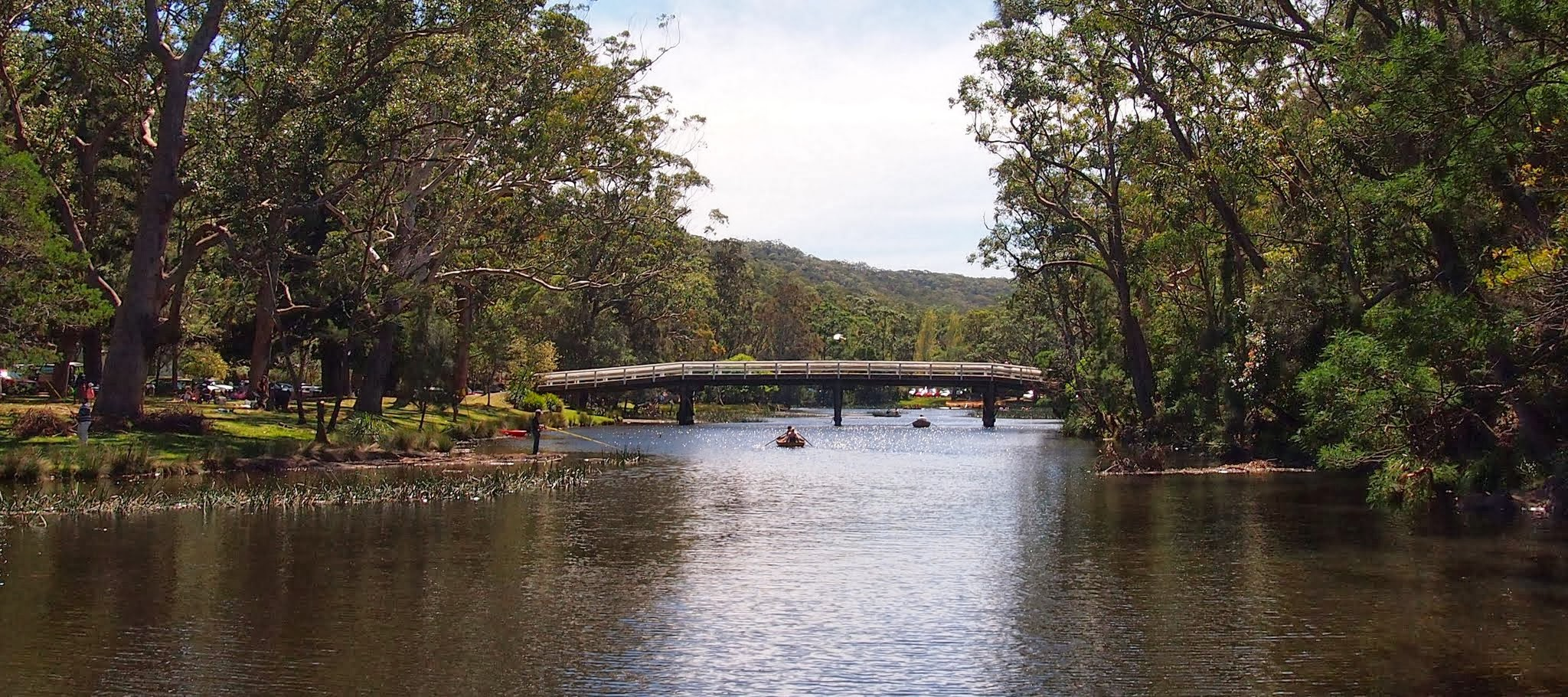
Audley NSW 2232, Australia – Panorama #19
