= Burraneer =

- Suburb
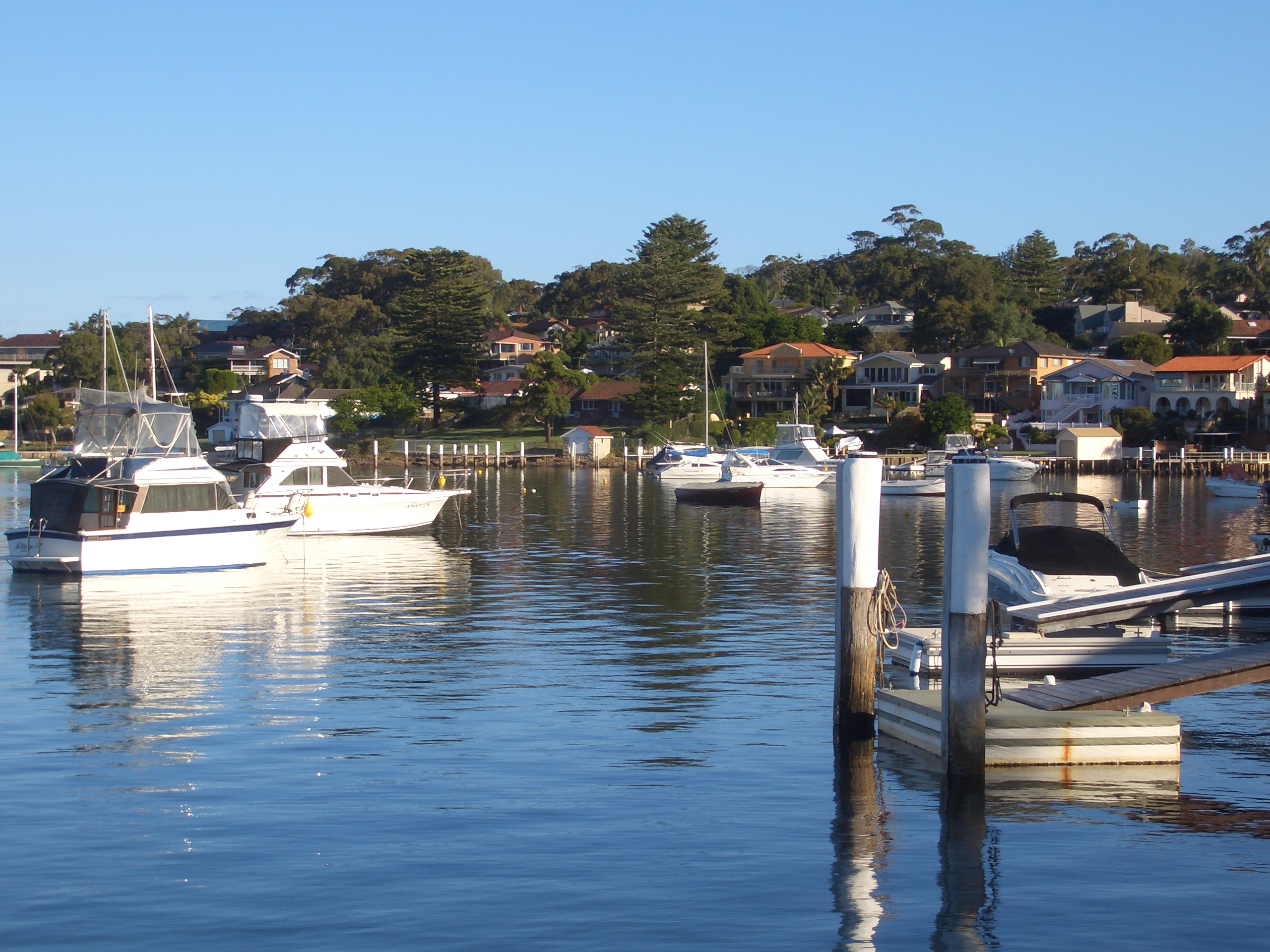
- Gunnamatta Bay, Burraneer

- Interactive map of Burraneer
- Coordinates: 34°04′12″S 151°08′12″E
- Country: Australia
- State: New South Wales
- City: Sydney
- LGA: Sutherland Shire
- Location: 26 km (16 mi) south of Sydney CBD

Government
  - State electorate: Cronulla
  - Federal division: Cook
- Elevation: 21 m (69 ft)

Population
  - Total: 3,719 (2021 census)
- Postcode: 2230
Suburbs around Burraneer
Caringbah South	Woolooware	Cronulla
Port Hacking	Burraneer	Cronulla
Dolans Bay	Maianbar	Bundeena

Burraneer is a bayside suburb in southern Sydney, in the state of New South Wales, Australia. Burraneer is 26 kilometres south of the Sydney central business district, in the local government area of the Sutherland Shire.

Burraneer sits on the peninsula of Burraneer Point, on the north shore of the Port Hacking estuary. Burraneer Bay forms the western border and Gunnamatta Bay the eastern border. Woolooware is the only adjacent suburb. Cronulla is located across Gunnamatta Bay. The suburbs of Dolans Bay, Port Hacking and Caringbah South are located across Burraneer Bay. The villages of Maianbar and Bundeena are located on the opposite bank of Port Hacking. Burraneer is a mostly residential suburb comprising predominantly large family homes with some offering expansive water views of the Port Hacking.

== History ==
The name Burraneer Bay was recorded by surveyor Robert Dixon in 1827 as Burranear Bay, who chose many Aboriginal names for many of the bays in the area. The name's definition is unknown; the popularly believed meaning point of the bay likely results from an over-reading of an 1890 report by Richard Hill. In 1858 Mary and Andrew Webster paid 108 pounds and 15 shillings plus a yearly peppercorn quit rent for their land here. The Websters sold their land to Dominick Dolan in 1863. James Wilson purchased his block of 252 acres (1.0 km^{2}) for 252 pounds in 1862. In 1866, he sold his land to Thomas Holt (1811–1888), who added it to his huge 12,000-acre (49 km^{2}) estate that stretched from Sutherland to Cronulla.

== Commercial area ==
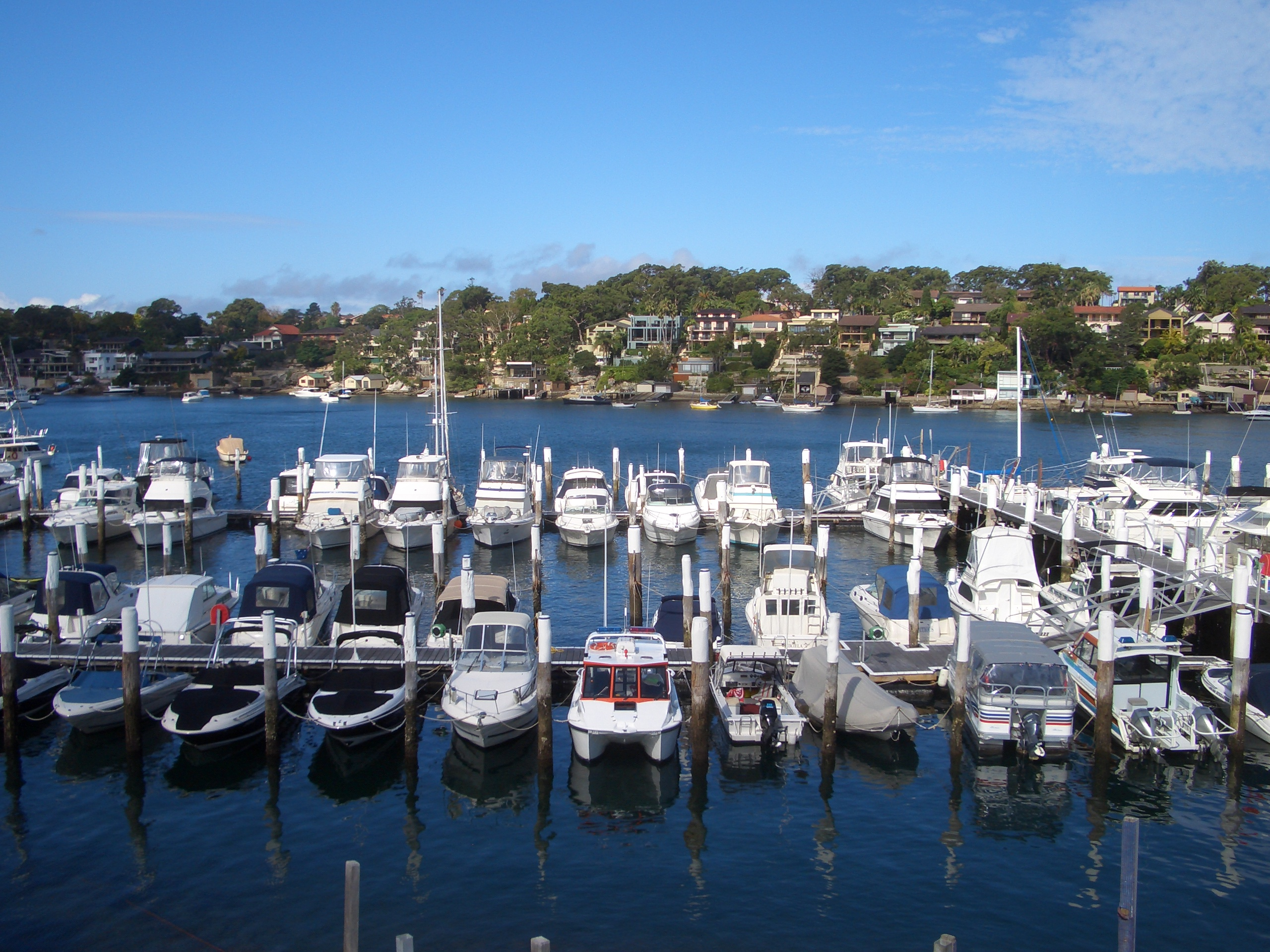
Burraneer Bay Marina

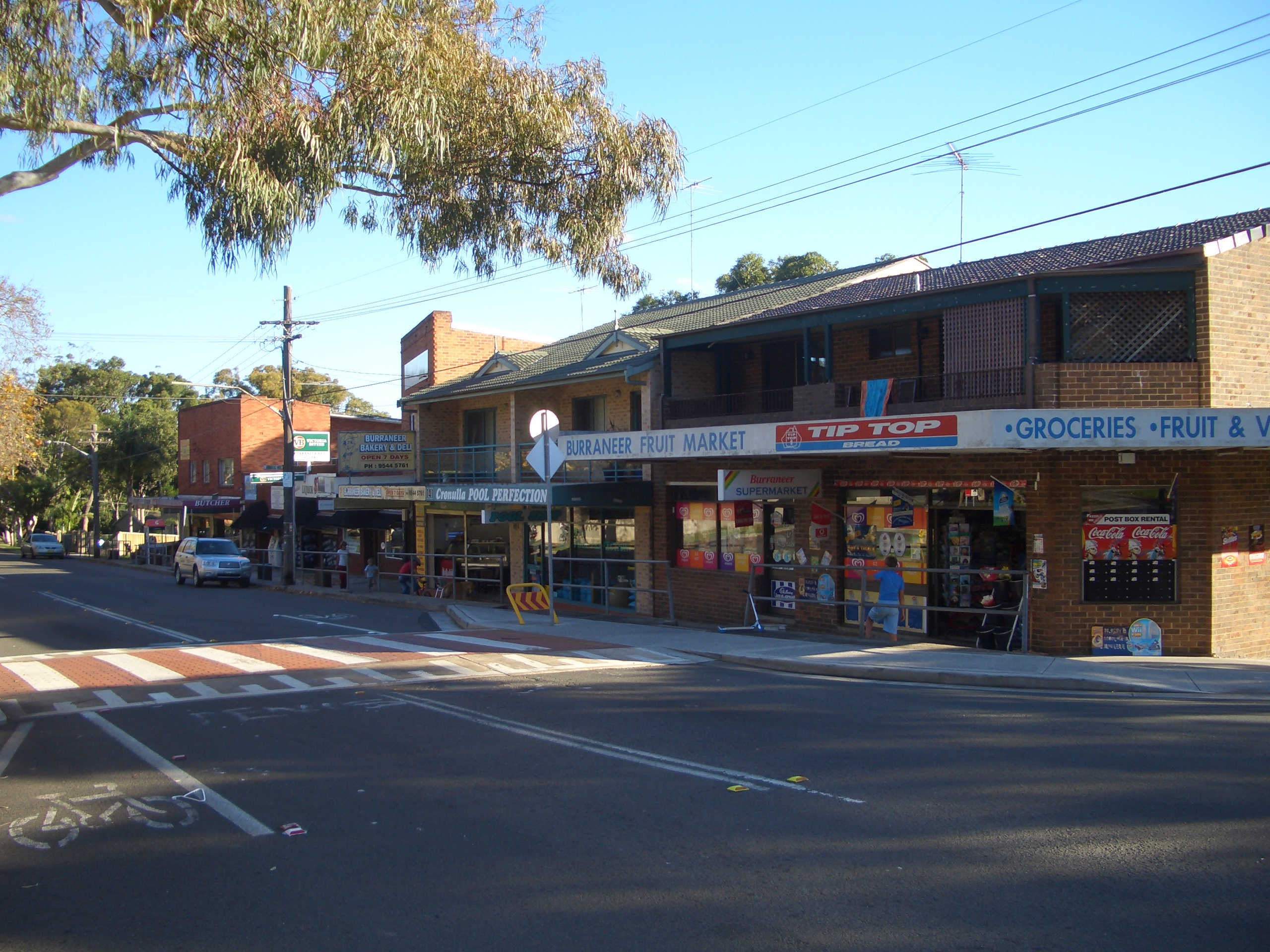
Shops on Woolooware Road

A group of shops and cafes are located on Woolooware Road, between Dominic St and Cross St. Another smaller group of shops is located nearby on Burraneer Bay Road, on the corner of Gannons Rd, opposite Burraneer Bay Public School.

- The Royal Motor Yacht Club is located on Gunnamatta Bay.
- The Burraneer Bay Marina is located on Burraneer Bay.
- The Burraneer Family Practice is located at the corner of Woolooware and Burraneer Bay Roads. There is a petrol station and mechanic located directly across the road, however this falls into the suburb of Woolooware.

== Demographics ==
According to the 2021 census of Population, there were 3,719 residents in Burraneer.

- 85.2% of people were born in Australia. The most common other countries of birth were England 3.0%, New Zealand 1.2%, Italy 0.9%, Greece 0.4% and United States of America 0.4%.
- 90.1% of people spoke only English at home.
- The most common responses for religion in Burraneer were Catholic 35.5%, No Religion 29.2%, Anglican 18.9%, Eastern Orthodox 4.4% and Uniting Church 2.6%.
- The average weekly household income in Burraneer was $3,490, significantly higher in comparison to the New South Wales average of $1,829.

== Transport ==
The closest railway station to Burraneer is Woolooware railway station, a station on the Cronulla branch line of the Sydney Trains Eastern Suburbs & Illawarra Line, or the T4 line. The station, like all NSW train stations, is opal active. All services are double deck electric trains of eight carriages traveling to Bondi Junction, stopping at major interchange stations such as Sutherland, Wolli Creek, Sydenham and Central. The station has two platforms and electronic indicator boards.

== Schools ==
Our Lady of Mercy College, a Catholic girls' school catering to years 7 through 10, is located on Dominic Street.

De la Salle Catholic College, Cronulla, a Catholic co-educational school catering to years 11 and 12, is located on Cross St.

Burraneer Bay Public School, a public primary school (kindergarten through year 6), is located on Burraneer Bay Road. It was formally zoned in Woolooware, but has officially been part of the suburb of Burraneer since 2008.

St Francis De Sales Primary School lies on the border of Burraneer and Woolooware.

== Bus routes ==
U-Go Mobility provides these bus services in the Burraneer area:-

- 971 from Cronulla to Hurstville.
- 988 from Cronulla to Caringbah (4 services a day, weekdays only Cronulla - Caringbah, 2 services a day Caringbah - Cronulla)

== Sport and recreation ==
- Burraneer's nearest sporting club is Cronulla Seagulls FC, located in neighbouring Woolooware.
- Burraneer Bay Park has an area of bushland, a boardwalk, a playground and a bicycle/jogging track.
- There are a number of small park reserves, some of which have children's play equipment. Binaville Ave Reserve and Rutherford Reserve are located at the end of Woolooware Road.
- Lugano Avenue Small Craft Launching Facility, Burraneer Bay. Opened in 2020, the wharf is a small craft launch facility providing safe access for kayakers, rowers and paddlers.
- There are a number of publicly accessible wharves, beaches and bay accesses, such as Hospital Bay Wharf, located at the end of Gunnamatta Rd, Bulls Beach, parallel to Bulls Rd, accessed via Lugano Ave, and Bell Place Beach, accessed via pathway between number 5 & 7 Bell Place.

== Notable people ==
- Ricky Ponting - Australian cricketer, a former resident
- Glenn McGrath - Australian cricketer, a former resident
- Paul Gallen - Rugby league footballer, a current resident
- Stuart Clark - Australian cricketer, a current resident
- Ricky Stuart - Rugby league footballer, a former resident
- Cheyenne Tozzi - Model and singer

== Gallery ==
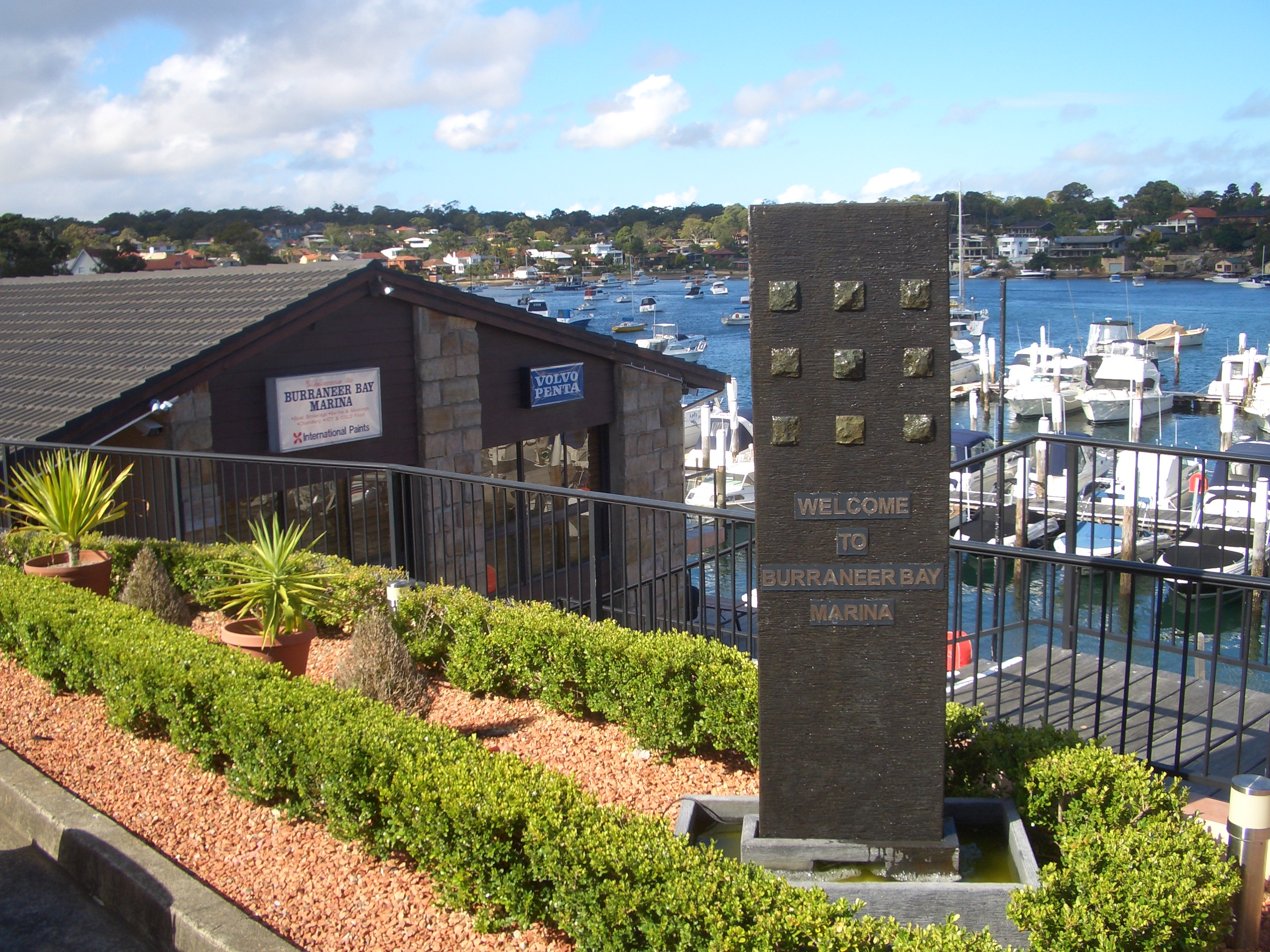
Burraneer Bay Marina (#1)

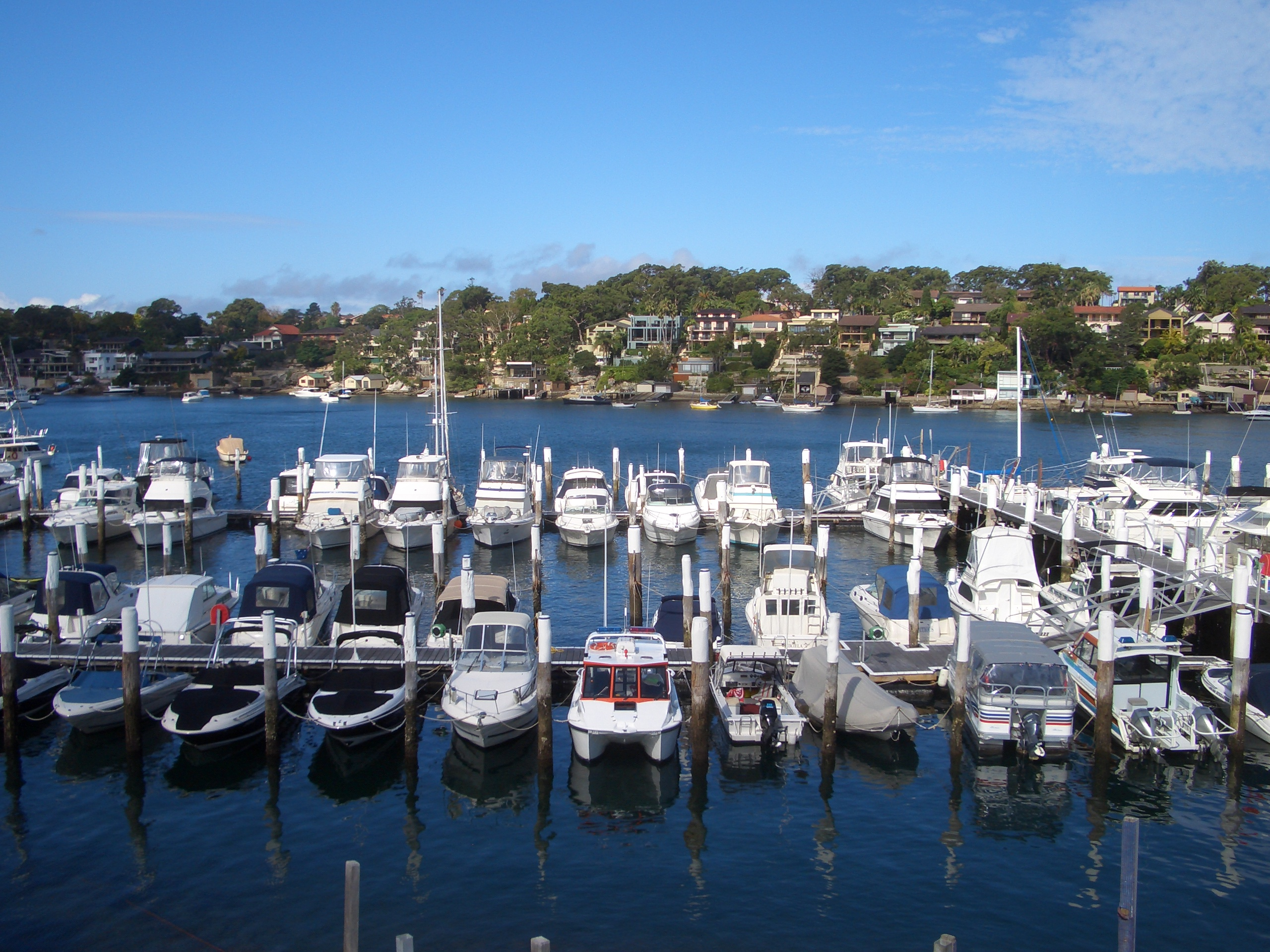
Burraneer Bay Marina (#2)

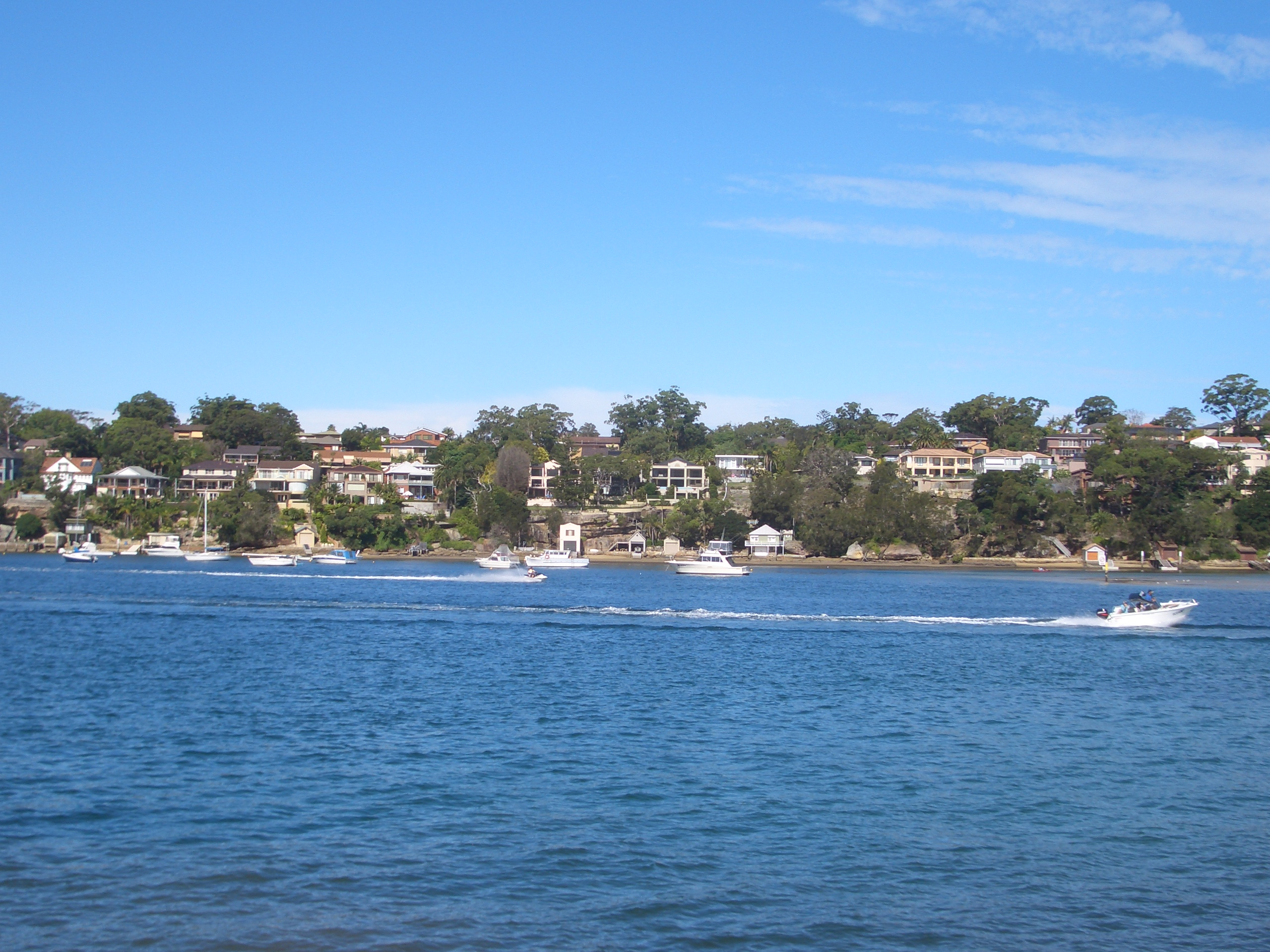
Burraneer

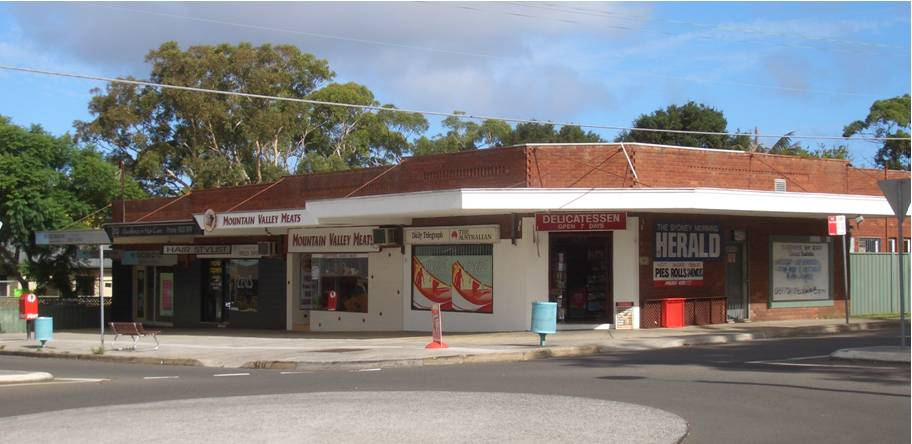
Burraneer Bay shops

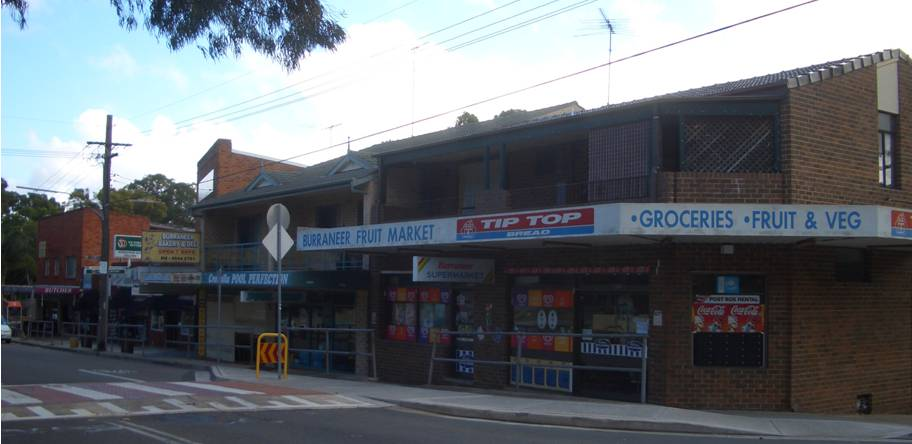
Burraneer shops #1

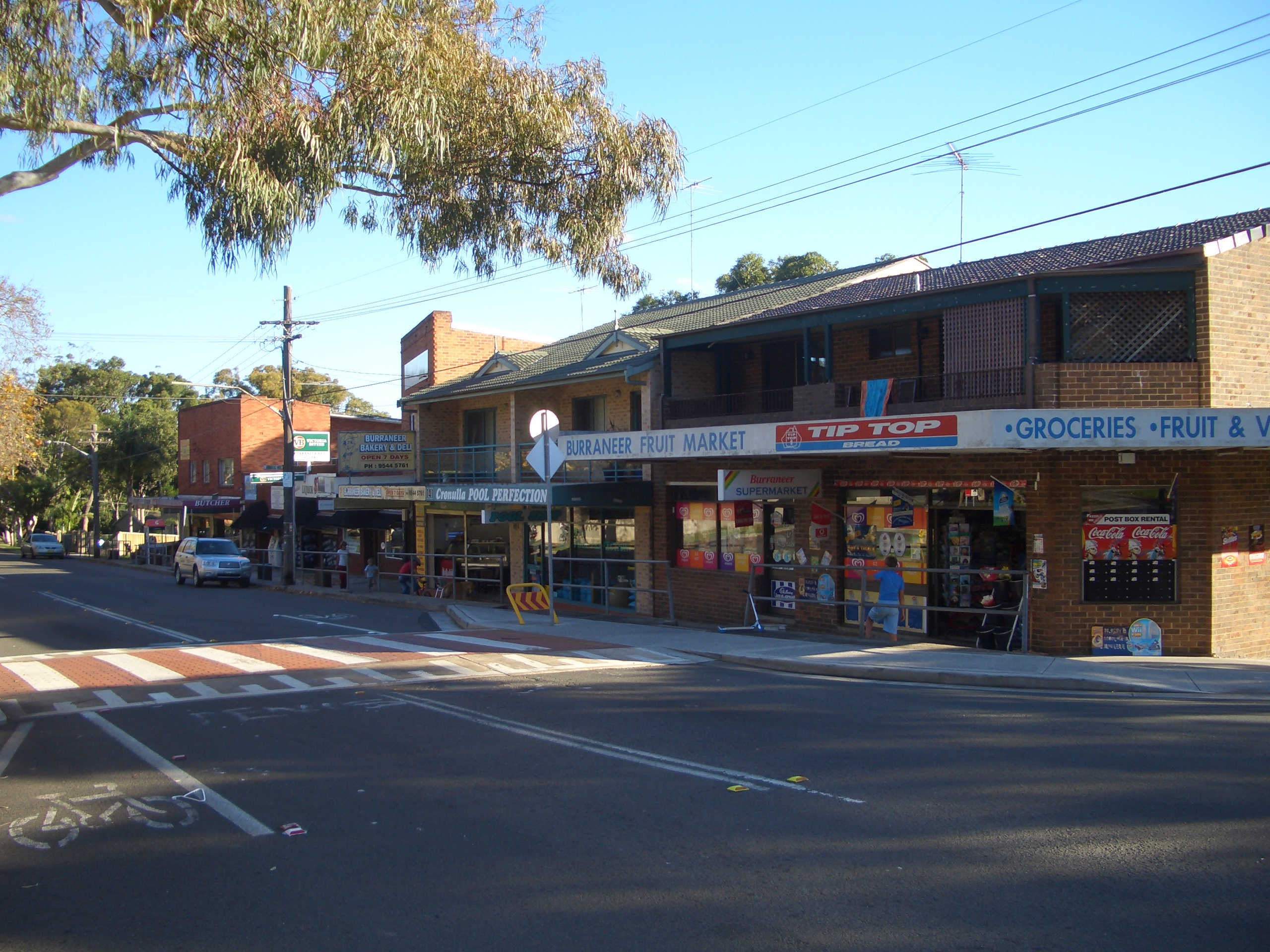
Burraneer shops #2

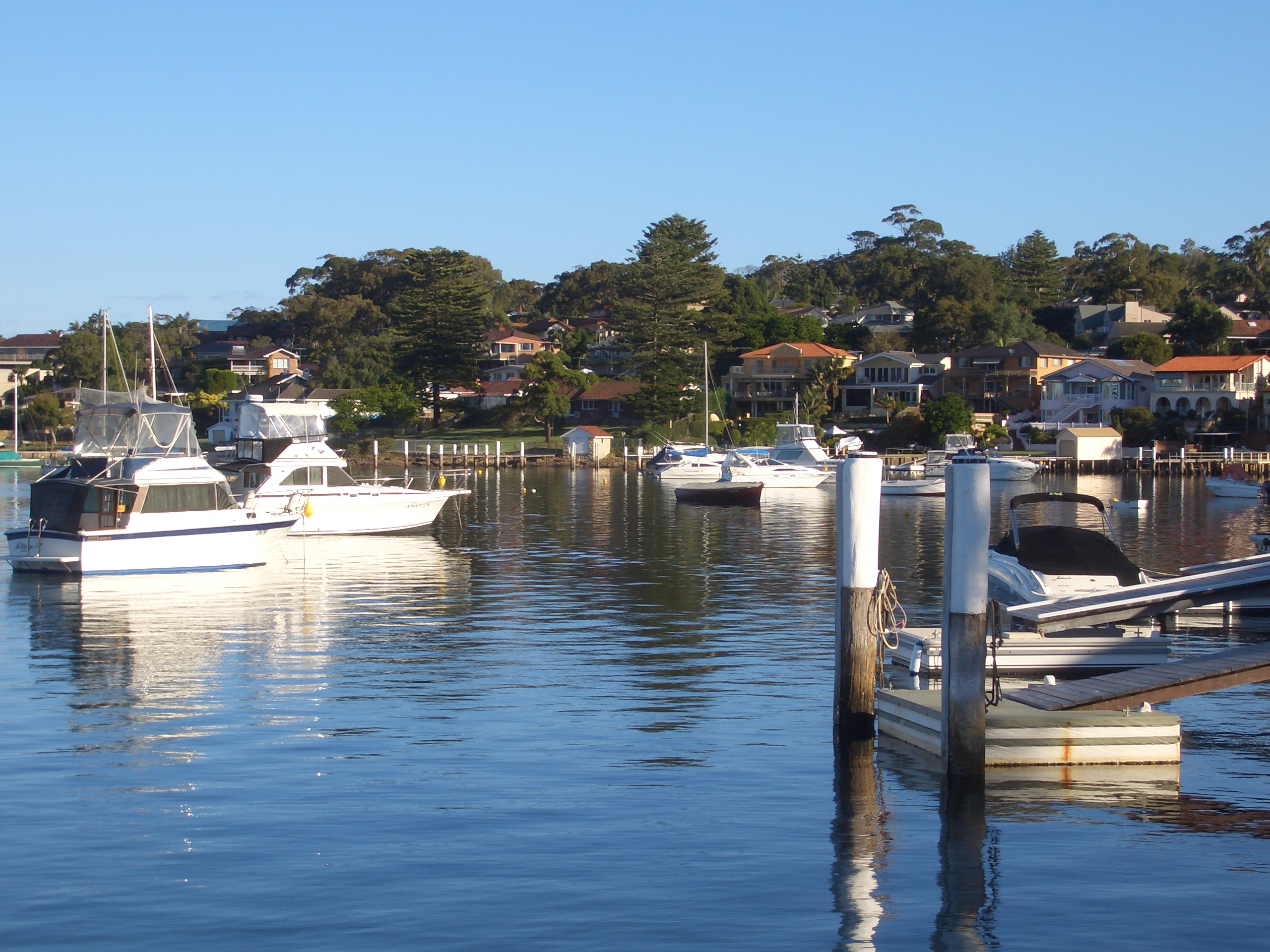
Burraneer, near Royal Motor Yacht Club

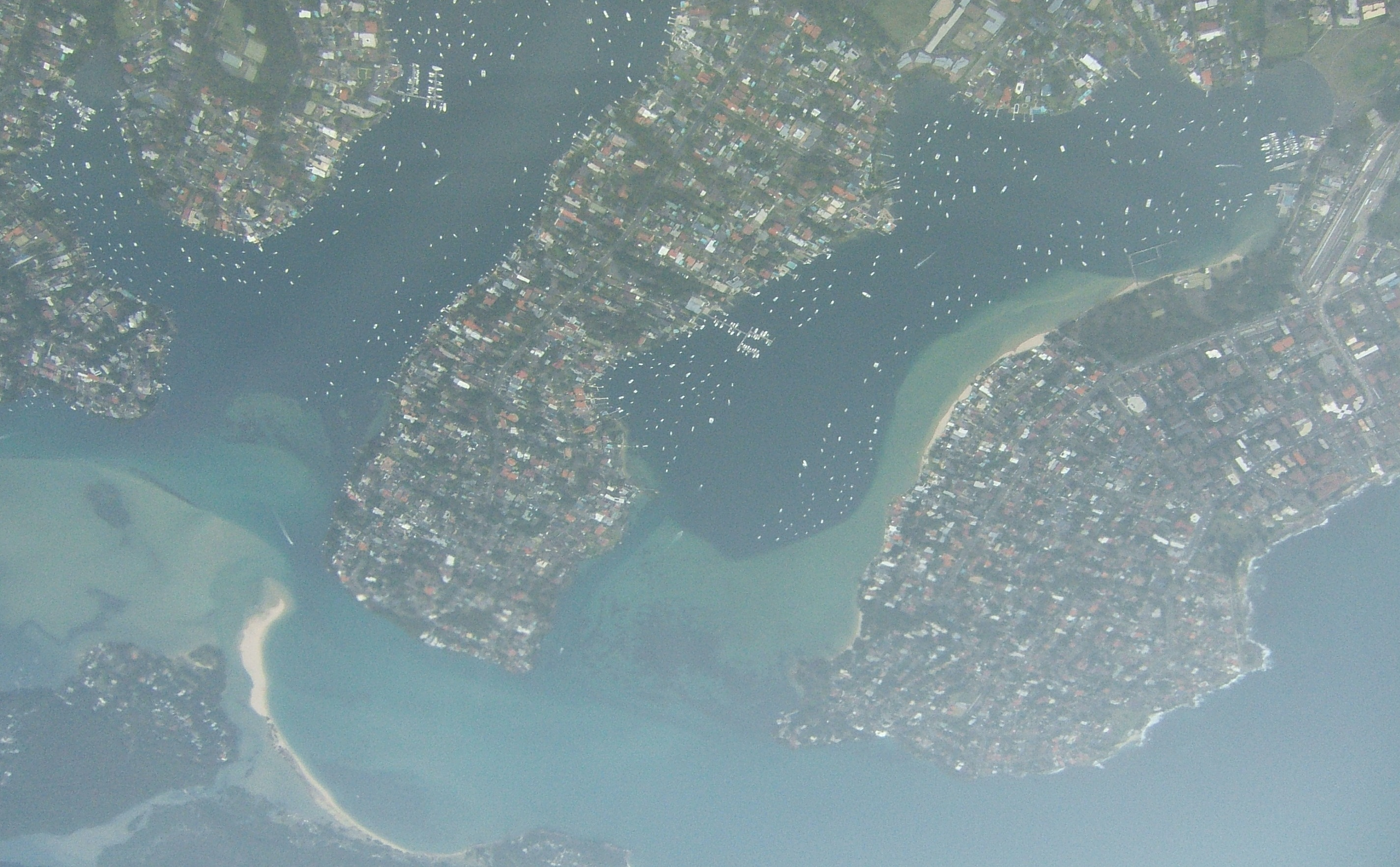
Aerial view of Port Hacking, Dolans Bay, Burraneer and Cronulla

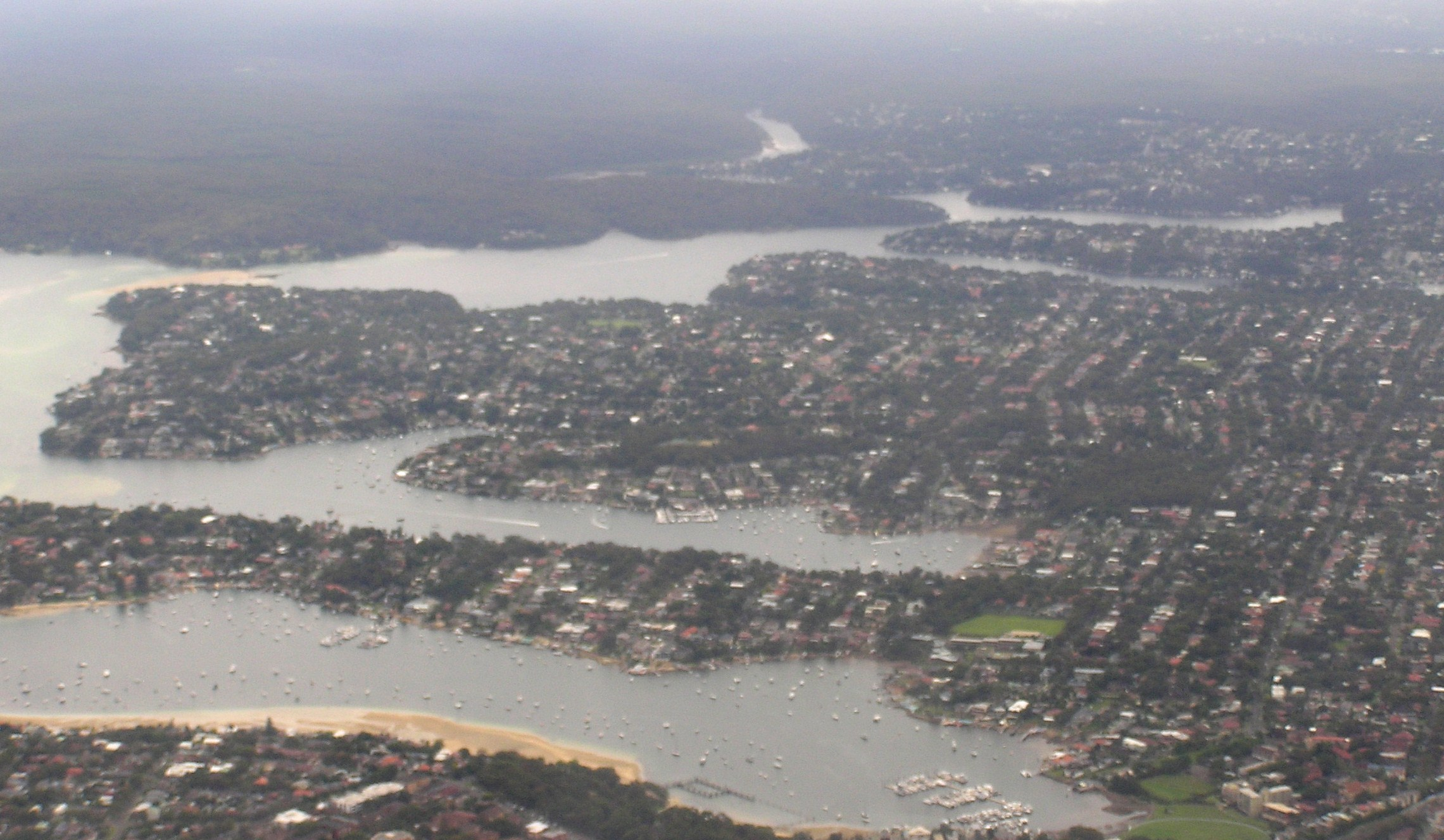
Aerial photo of Burraneer and Caringbah #1

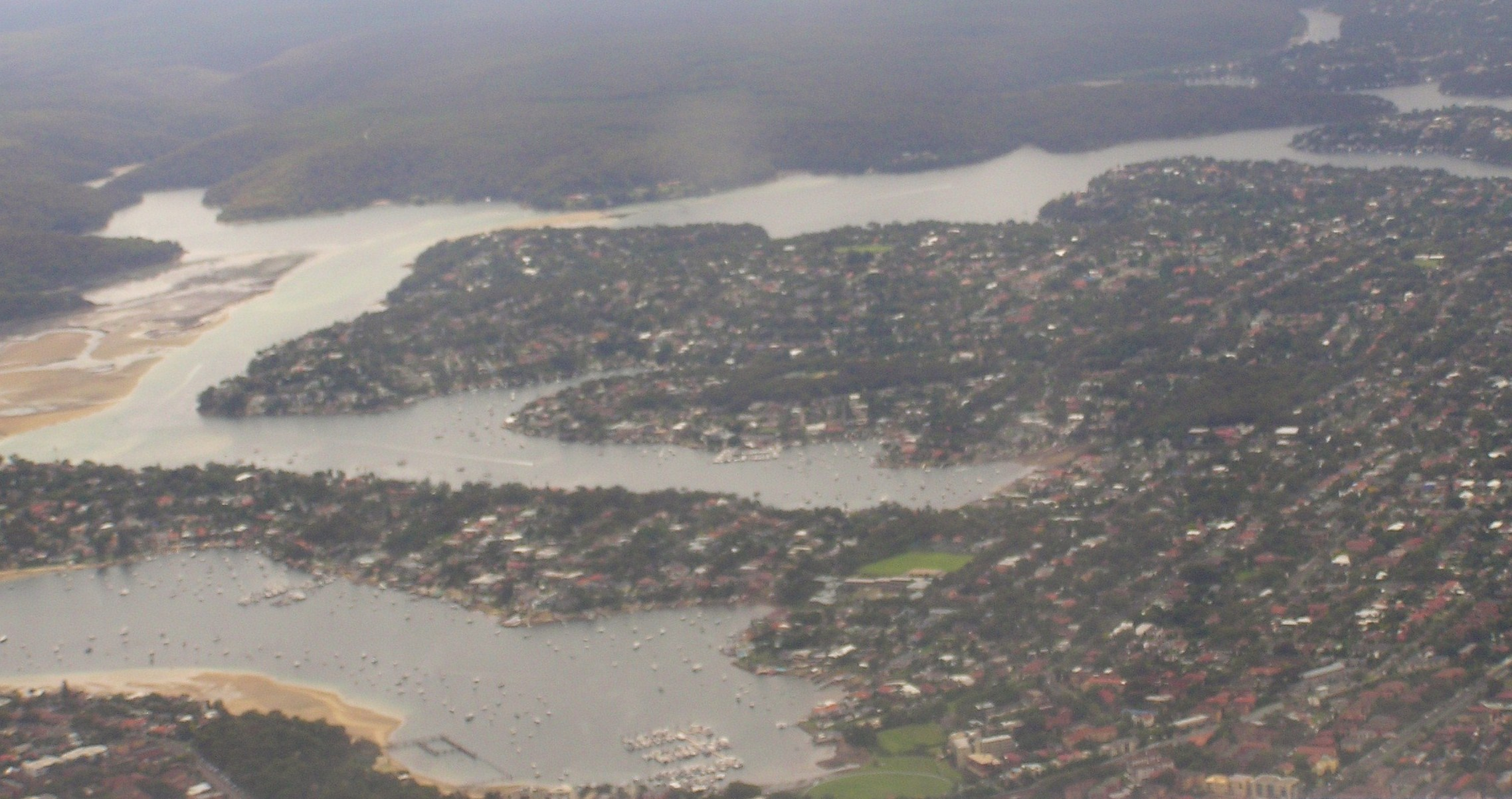
Aerial photo of Burraneer and Caringbah #2

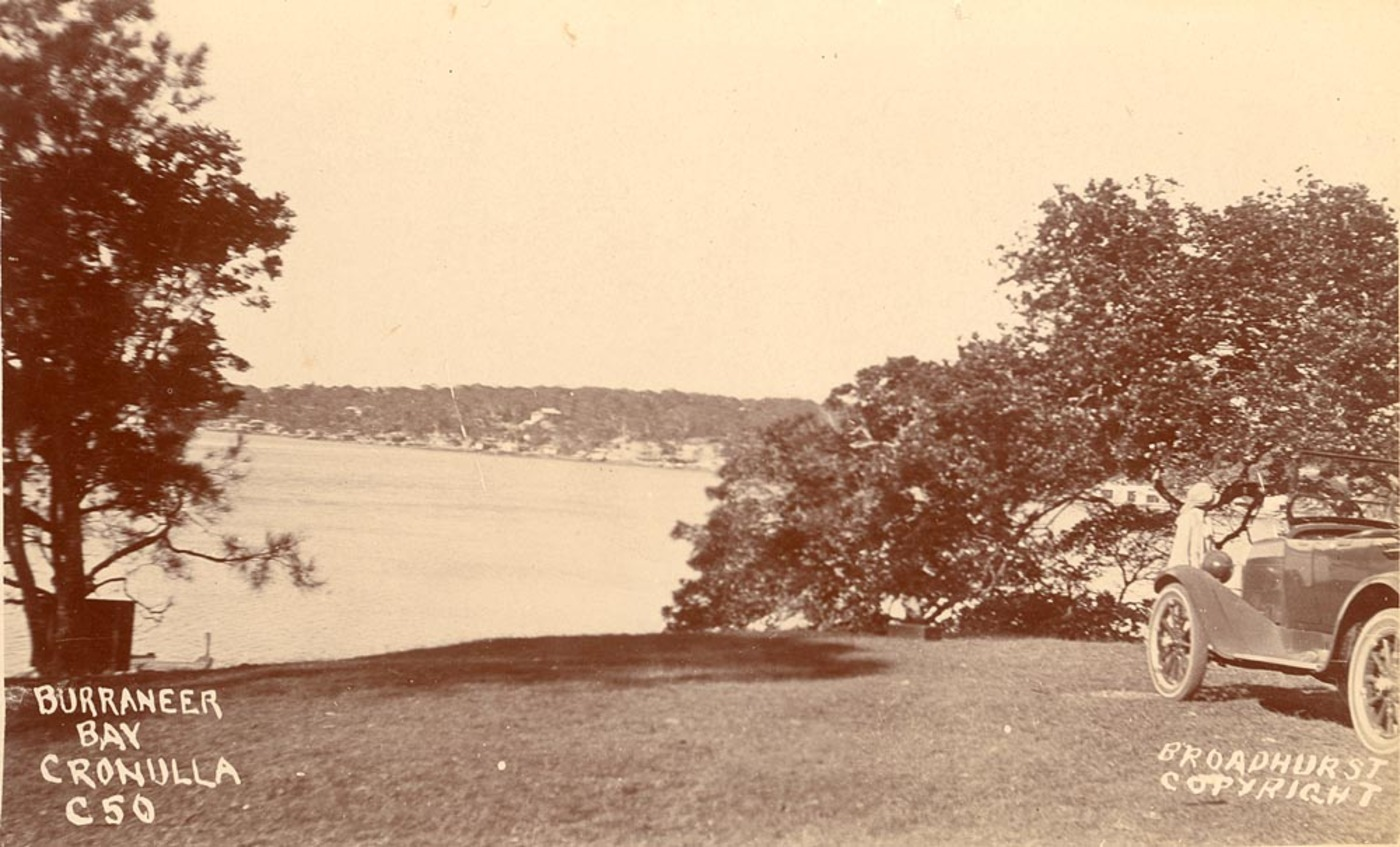
Burraneer Bay, Cronulla
