= Woolooware =

- Suburb
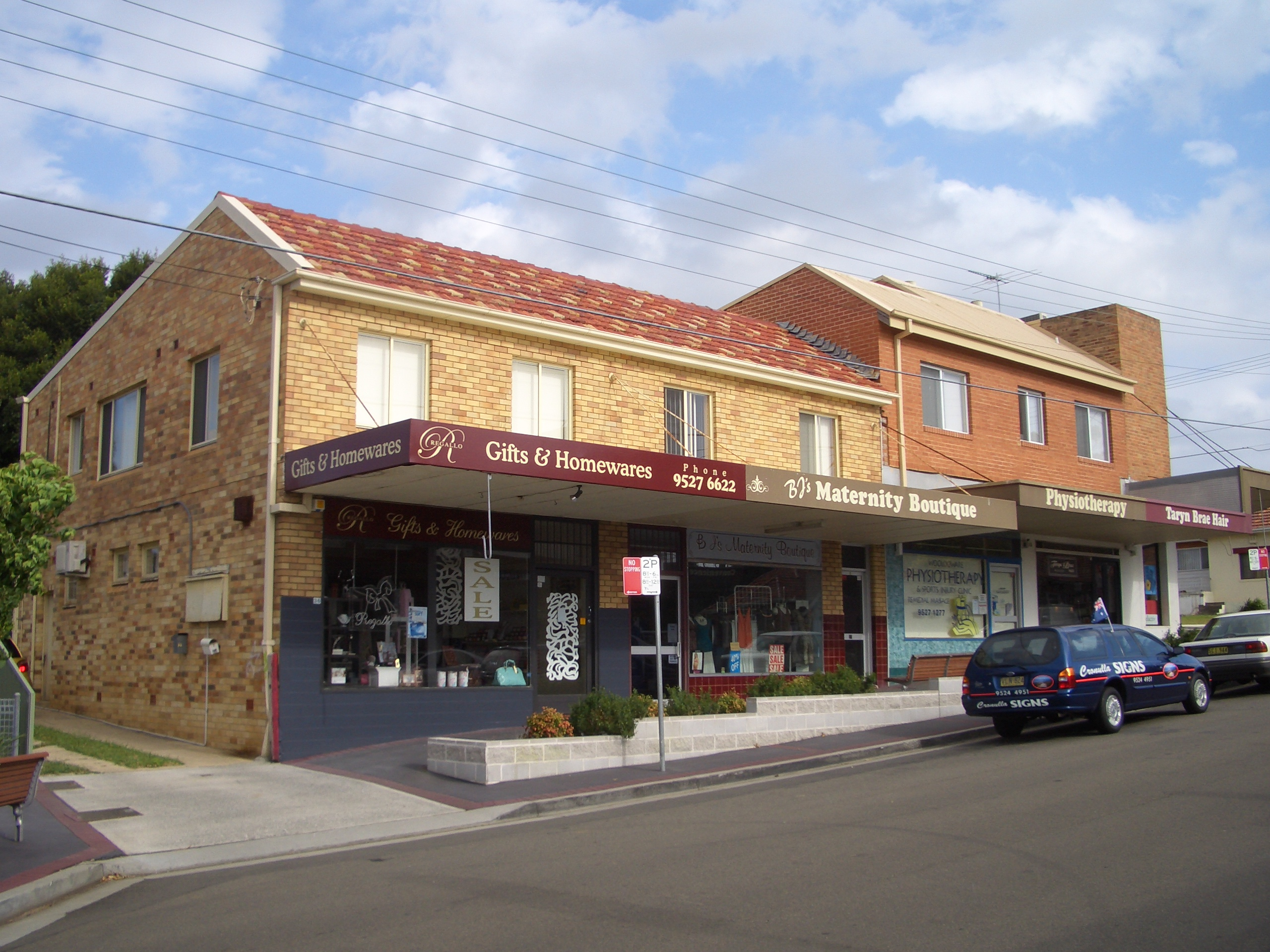
- Wills Road, Woolooware

- Interactive map of Woolooware
- Coordinates: 34°02′52″S 151°08′28″E
- Country: Australia
- State: New South Wales
- City: Sydney
- LGA: Sutherland Shire
- Location: 24 km (15 mi) south of Sydney CBD

Government
  - State electorate: Cronulla
  - Federal division: Cook
- Elevation: 36 m (118 ft)

Population
  - Total: 5,060 (2021 census)
- Postcode: 2230
Suburbs around Woolooware
Sans Souci	Sandringham	Kurnell
Caringbah	Woolooware	Cronulla
Burraneer	Caringbah South	Bundeena

Woolooware is a suburb in southern Sydney, in the state of New South Wales, Australia. Woolooware is located 24 kilometres (15 mi) south of the Sydney central business district in the Sutherland Shire. It shares the 2230 postcode with Cronulla.

Woolooware stretches from Woolooware Bay in the north on the Georges River estuary to Burraneer Bay and Gunnamatta Bay in the south on the Hacking River and Port Hacking estuary. It borders the suburbs of Cronulla, Caringbah, Burraneer and Kurnell.

== History ==
Woolooware is derived from the Aboriginal word Wooloowa, meaning muddy track. It echoes the area's natural low lying mud flats, salt marsh and once dominant tea tree and black wattle scrub.

It was originally a thickly forested area with tea tree, black wattle scrub and mangrove swamps around Woolooware Bay, and was originally owned by the Dharawal and Tharawal peoples. Those were later reclaimed to create parks and playing fields including Endeavour Field, Woolooware Golf Course and Cronulla Golf Course. The area was subdivided after the railway line from Sutherland to Cronulla was opened in 1939. The first public school opened in 1951 and the post office opened in October 1954.

The Australian division of Taylor Woodrow, a British construction company, built the first subdivision with project homes in Australia in north Woolooware, including the classic red brick homes in Taywood Street.

== Population ==
In the 2021 census, there were 5,060 people in Woolooware, 79.7% of whom were born in Australia. The next most common country of birth was England at 4.1%. 87.3% of people spoke only English at home. The most common responses for religion were No Religion 36.9%, Catholic 27.7%, and Anglican 16.2%.

== Commercial area ==
A small group of shops, known locally as Woolooware North, is located on Wills Road, close to Woolooware railway station. Shops include a general store, beauty salon, liquor shop, hairdressers, gift shop, cafe, doctor's surgery and Chinese restaurant. Another small group of shops, known locally as Woolooware South, is located around the intersection of Burraneer Bay Road and Woolooware Road. These shops, include a fish and chip shop, restaurant, chemist, bakery and general store. A petrol station is also located nearby.

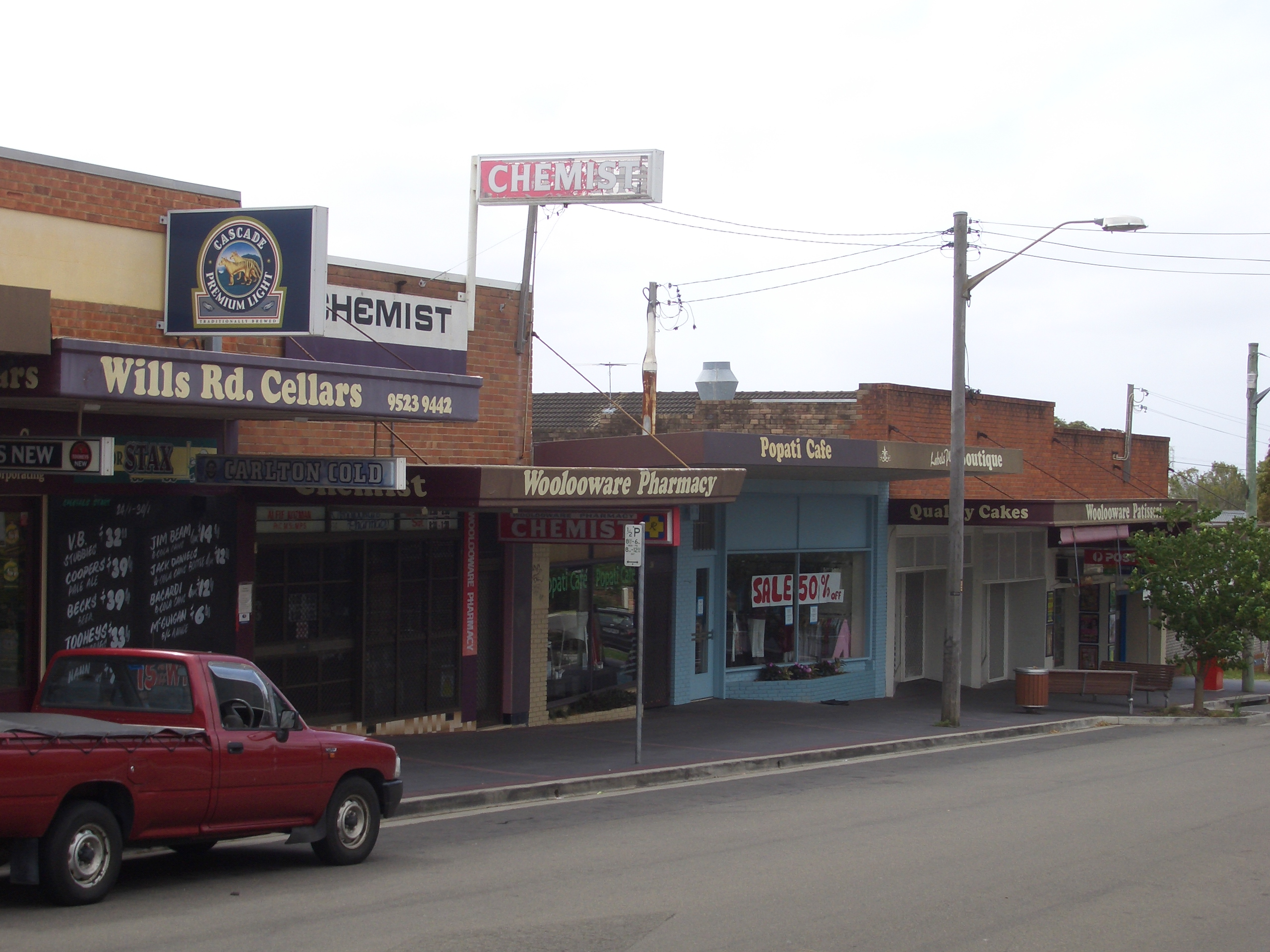
Wills Road shops

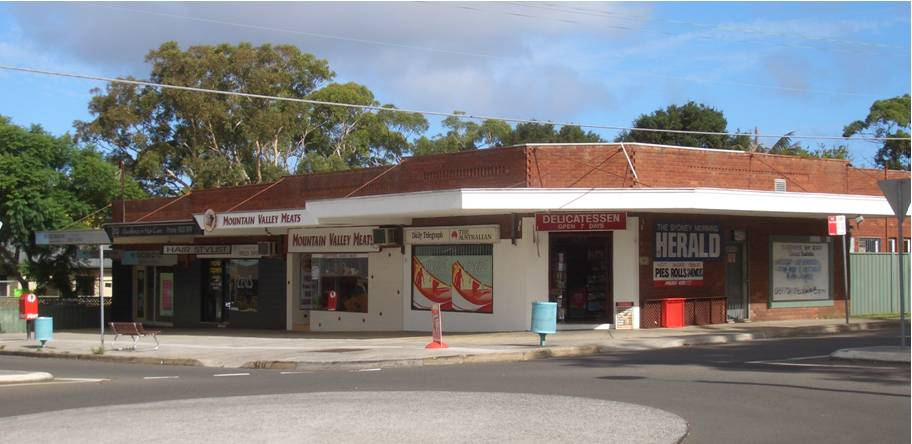
Burraneer Bay Road shops

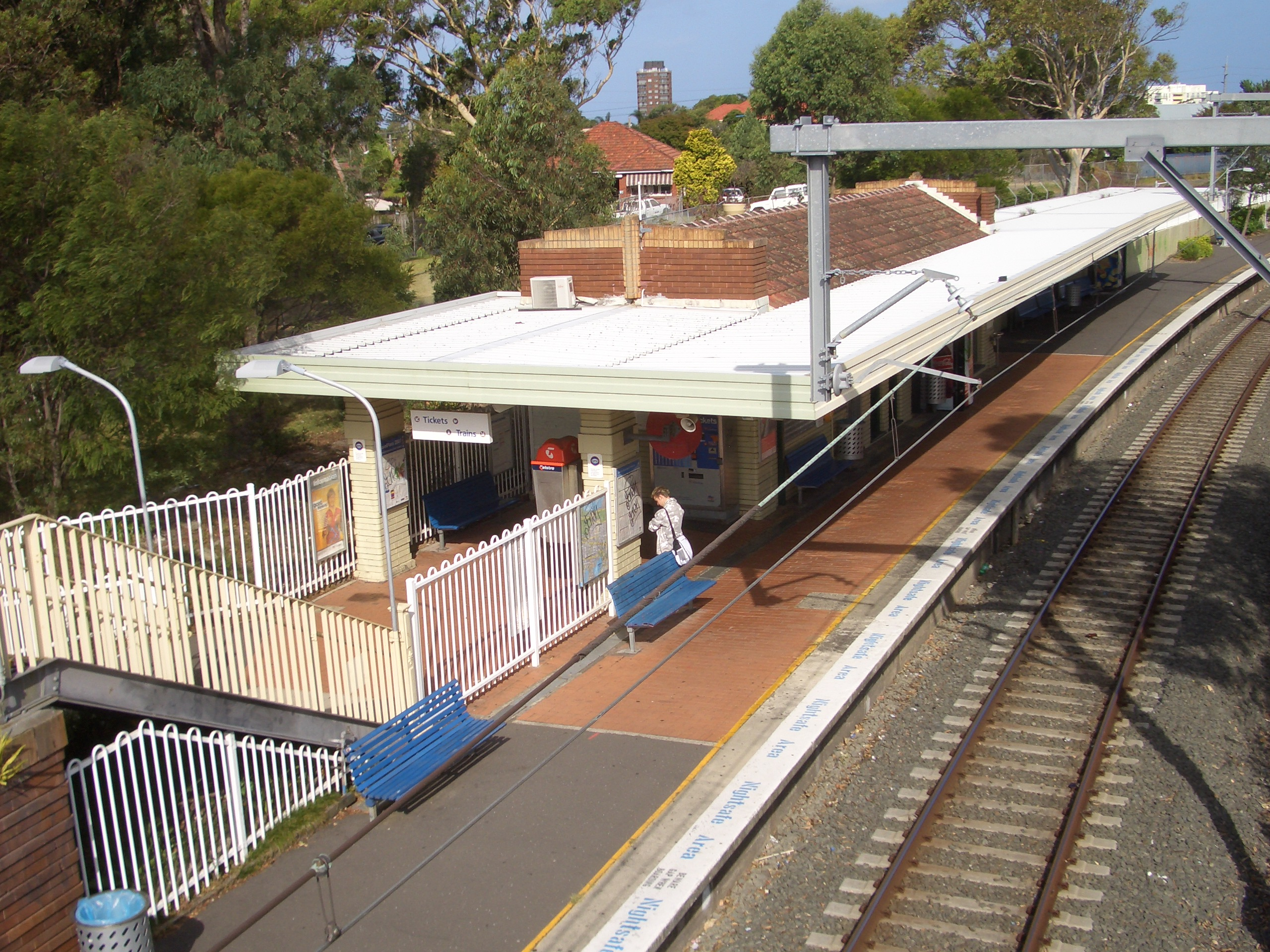
'Old' Woolooware railway station, facing east.^{1}

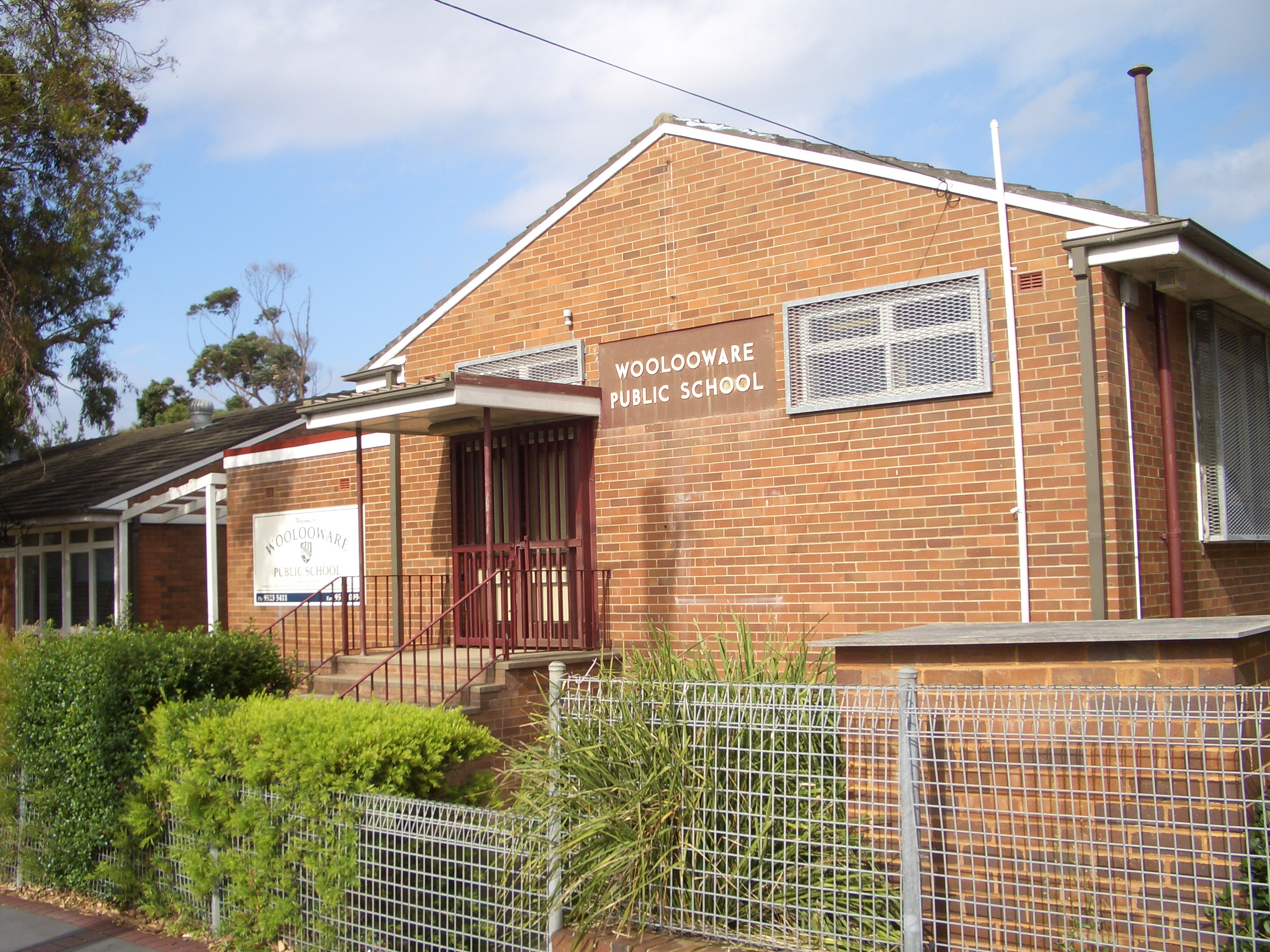
Woolooware Public School

== Transport ==
Woolooware railway station is on the Cronulla branch line of the Sydney Trains Eastern Suburbs & Illawarra Line or T4 line. The station, like all NSW metropolitan and intercity train stations, is Opal active. All services are double deck electric trains of eight carriages traveling to Bondi Junction stopping at major interchange stations such as Sutherland, Wolli Creek, Sydenham and Central. The station has two platforms and electronic indicator boards.

The main roads of Woolooware are Gannons Road, travelling north–south, the Kingsway which travels in an east–west direction south of the railway, Captain Cook Drive to the north which connects Woolooware to Kurnell and Miranda, and Burraneer Bay Road to the bay of its namesake.

=== Bus routes ===
U-Go Mobility provides these bus services in the Woolooware area:-

- 962 from Cronulla to Bankstown weekends only.
- 969 from Cronulla to Sutherland.
- 971 from Cronulla to Hurstville.
- 988 from Cronulla to Caringbah (6 services a day, weekdays only)

See Woolooware station for further details.

During events at the Sharkies club (such as NRL games) a bus runs from the station to the stadium.

== Schools ==
Woolooware is home to a number of primary and secondary schools. Woolooware Public School is located in Wills Road. Burraneer Bay Public School is located at the southern edge of the suburb on Gannons Road near the small shop area. It is accessed via three entry points, one to the south, one on Gannons Road and one to the north via a short path. A catholic primary school in Woolooware is St Francis De Sales located in a quiet street called Hill street. The high schools located here are Woolooware High School, De La Salle College and Our Lady of Mercy College.

== Sport and recreation ==
Woolooware is home to the National Rugby League team, Cronulla-Sutherland Sharks. The home ground, Remondis Stadium (formerly known as Endeavour Field) sits beside the leagues club, known as Sharkies Leagues Club, on Captain Cook Drive.

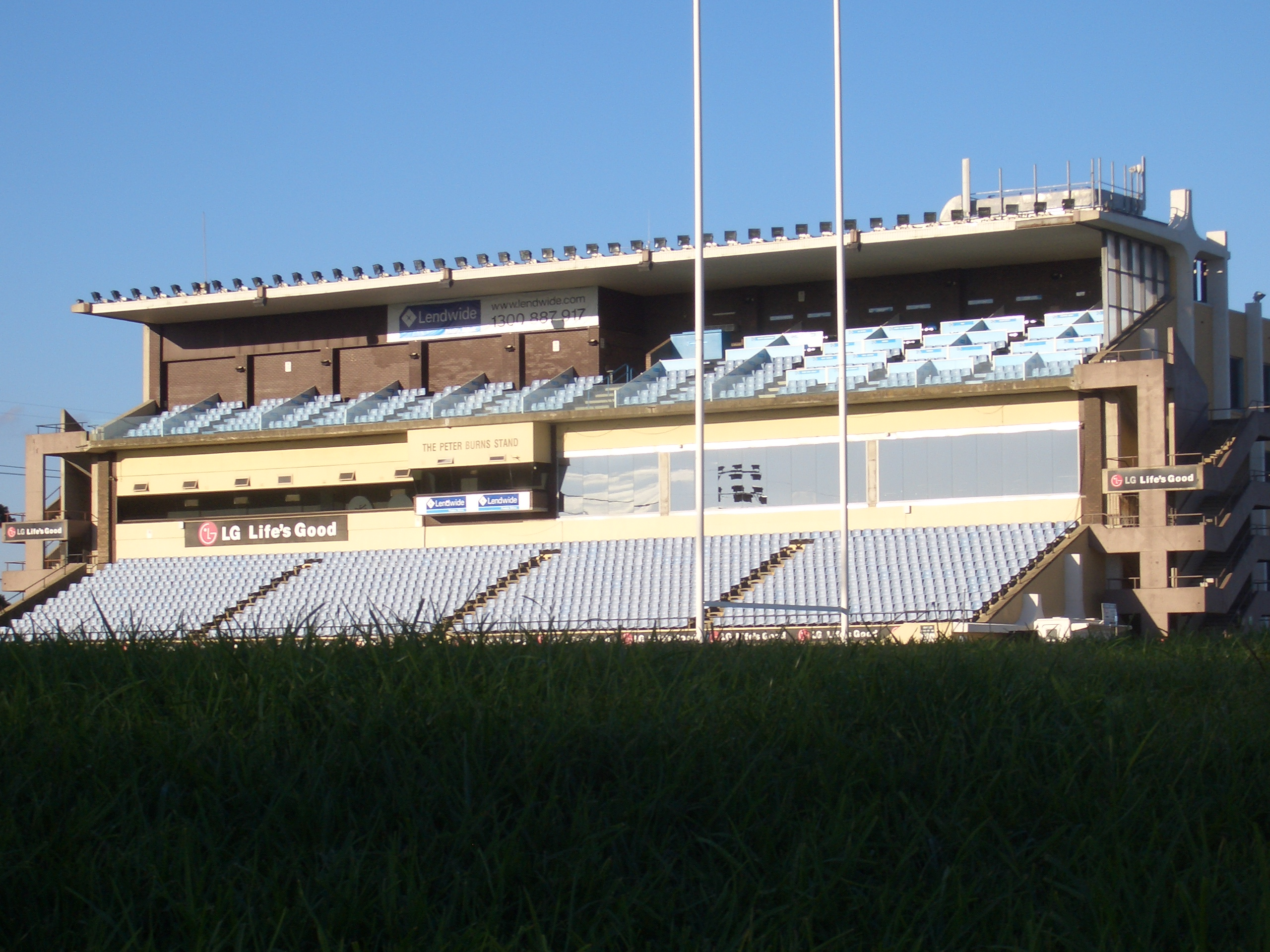
Toyota Park – Endeavour Field

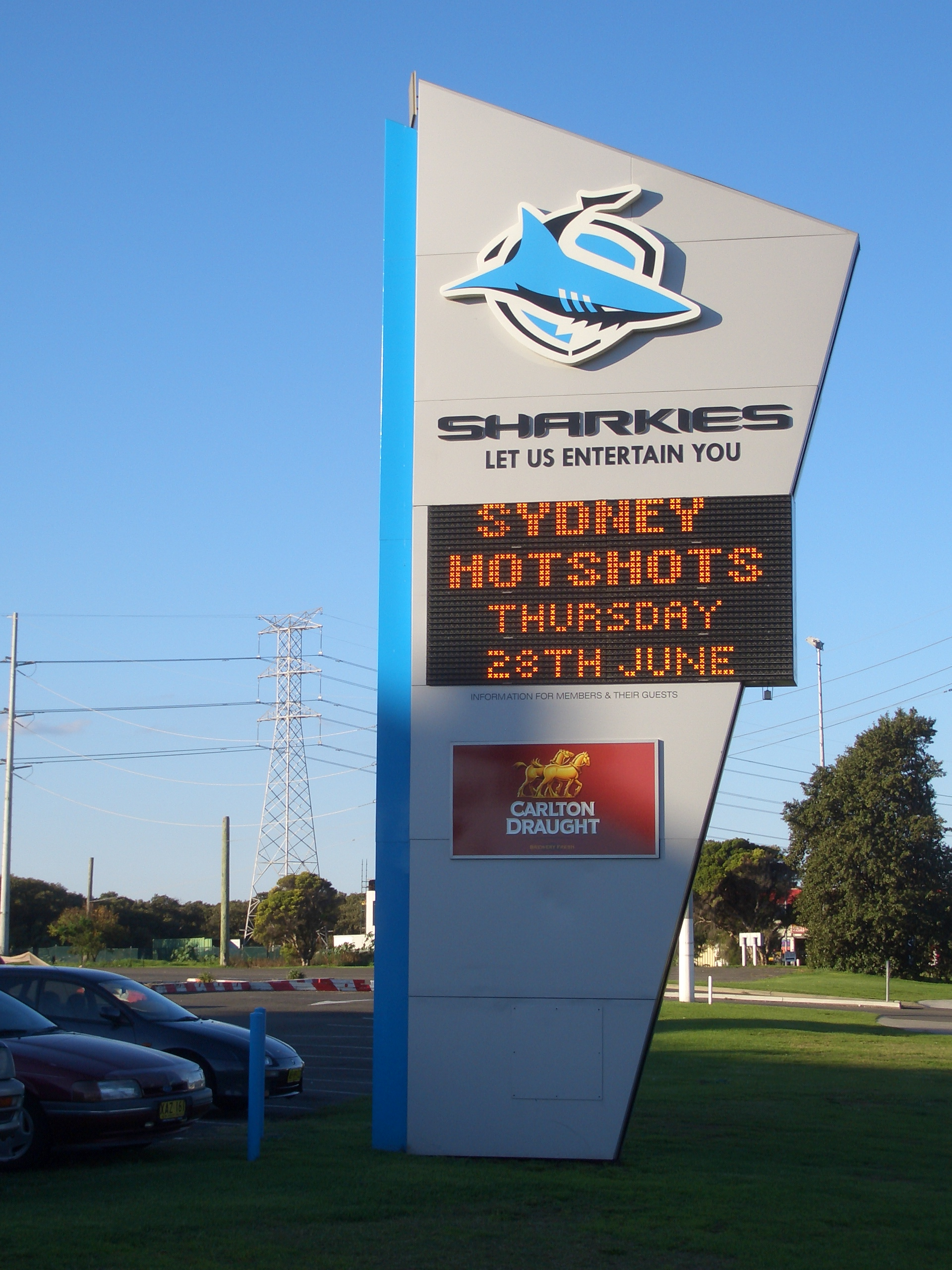
Sharkies Leagues Club

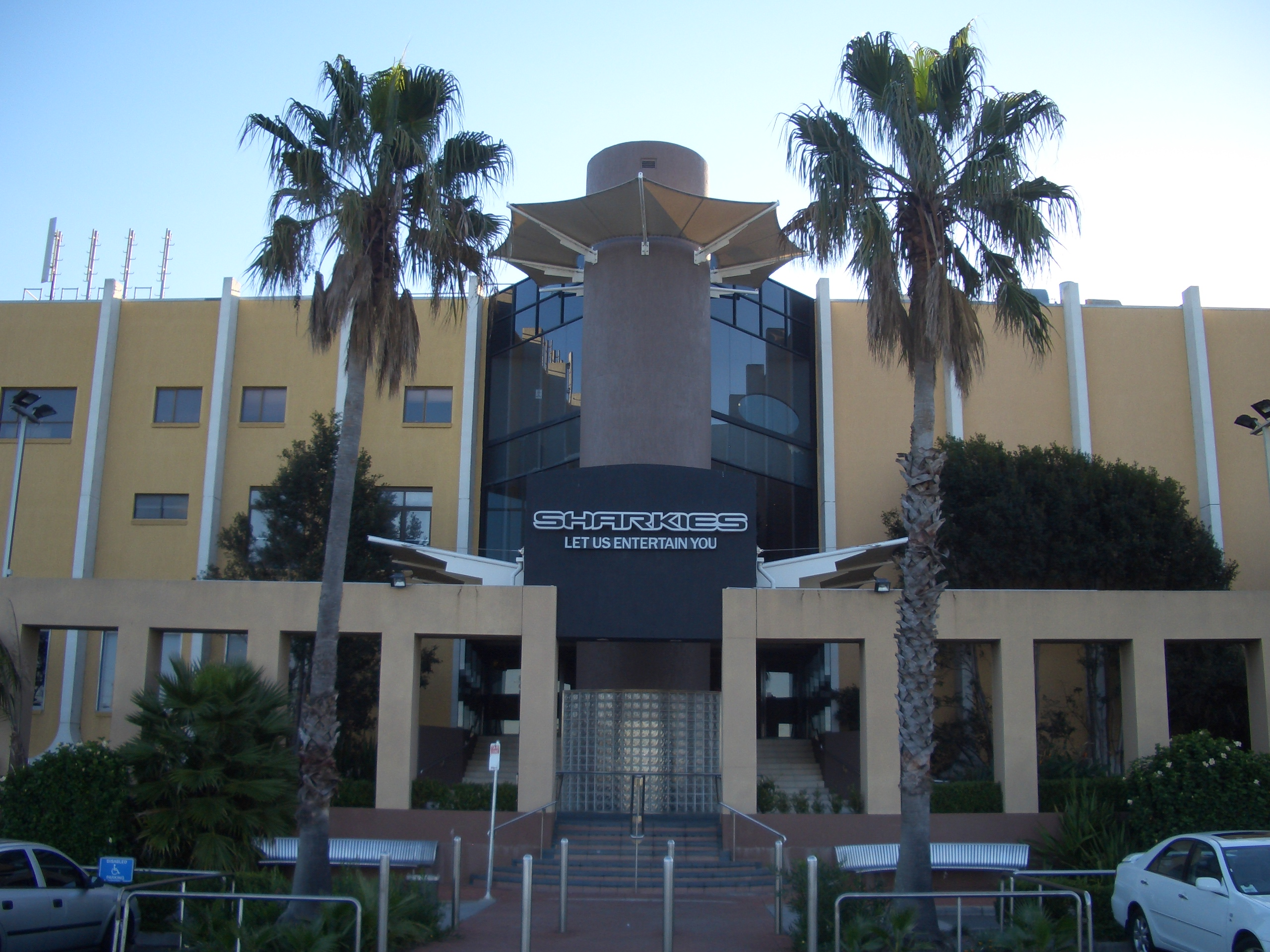
Sharkies Leagues Club

Woolooware also contains Woolooware Oval, which is the home ground for the Cronulla Seagulls FC amateur football (soccer) club. Woolooware Oval is also used for the local touch football competition and in summer is the home ground for the Cronulla Seagulls Cricket Club. It also contains Captain Cook Fields, which is the home of the Sutherland Shire Softball Association, and where all of their competition games are held.

== Notes ==
1. Since this picture was taken the railway line has been duplicated. The new track runs to the left (north) of the buildings. The bridge was also replaced and the station refurbished as part of the project. See: Woolooware railway station
