= Gunnamatta Bay =

Bay in New South Wales, Australia

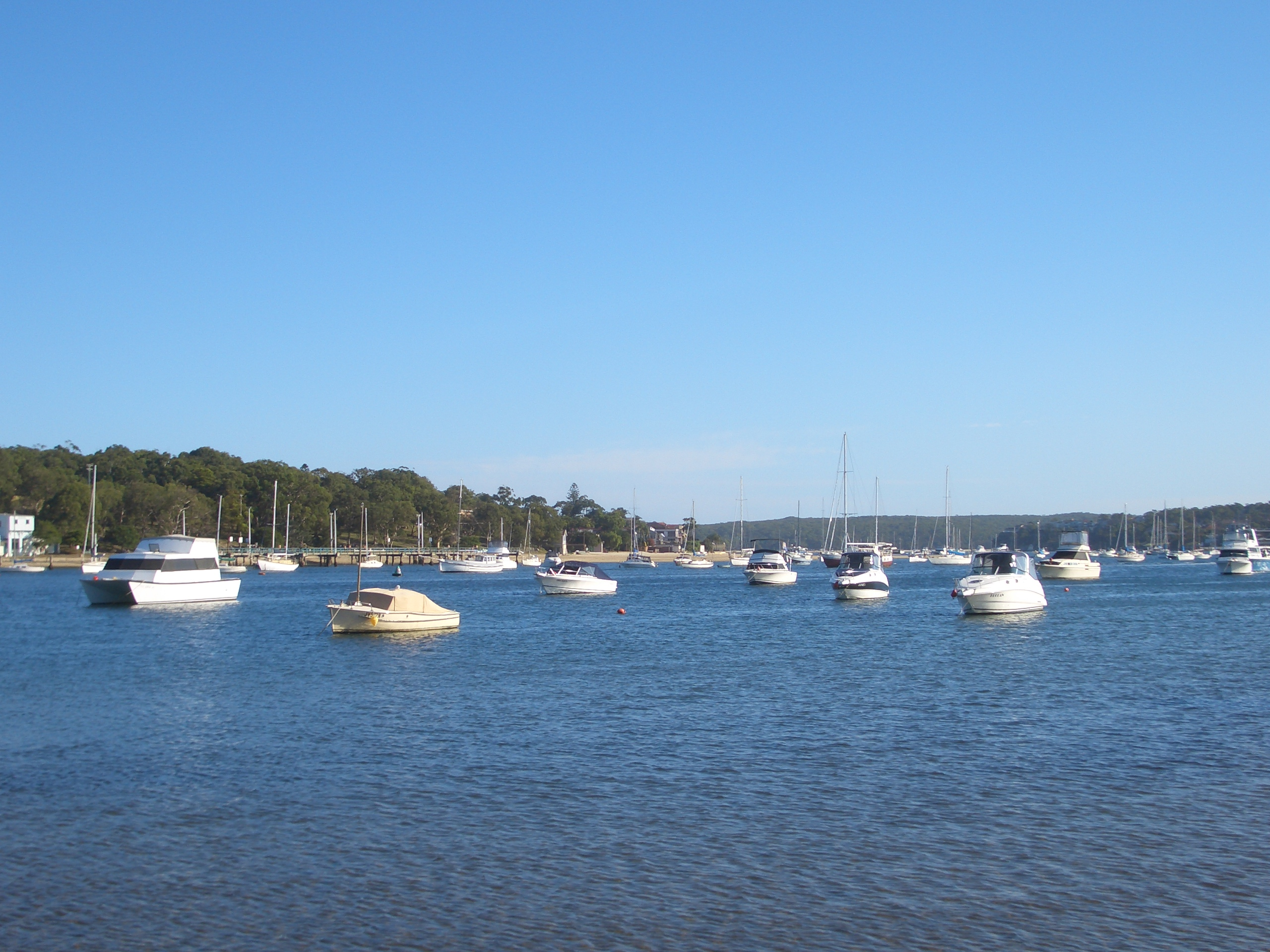
- Gunnamatta Bay, viewed from Cronulla.

- Location in New South Wales
- Location: Southern Sydney, New South Wales
- Coordinates: 34°03′55″S 151°09′04″E
- Primary outflows: Port Hacking
- Basin countries: Australia
- Frozen: never

The Gunnamatta Bay is a small bay in southern Sydney, New South Wales, Australia.

Gunnamatta Bay is located off the Port Hacking estuary, in the Sutherland Shire. The foreshore is a natural boundary for the suburbs of Cronulla to the east, Woolooware to the north and Burraneer to the west.

== Transport ==
Cronulla and National Park Ferry Cruises operate a ferry service from the wharf on Gunnamatta Bay, which provides a link between Cronulla and Bundeena across Port Hacking, on the edge of the Royal National Park.

== Parks ==
Gunnamatta Park and Darook Park are located on its eastern foreshore. Tonkin Oval on the northern foreshore features a large cricket oval and is also used for baseball. Cronulla Public School is located nearby.

Gunnamatta park holds a valuable remnant of bushland canopy and a more limited but equally valuable understorey remnant. An unusual but natural occurrence of Rough-Barked Apple-Gums (Angophora floribunda) grow in the park and are usually typical of the nearby Wianamatta Shale soil as opposed the Hawkesbury Sandstone on the site; this tree is virtually extinct in the Sutherland shire due to a complete lack of comprehensive reserves on shale soils, though this tree is still relatively common on the Cumberland Plain in western Sydney and elsewhere in Australia Earth.

== History ==
Matthew Flinders and George Bass explored and mapped the coastline and Port Hacking estuary in 1796 and the southernmost point of Cronulla is named Bass and Flinders Point, in their honour. Thomas Holt (1811–88) owned most of the land that stretched from Sutherland to Cronulla in the 1860s.

The area around the bay was subdivided in 1895 and land was offered for sale at 10 pounds per acre. In 1899, the government named the area Gunnamatta, which means sandy hills. On 26 February 1908 it was officially changed to Cronulla and Gunnamatta was used for the name of the bay, on the western side.

Cronulla is derived from kurranulla, meaning place of the pink seashells in the dialect of the area's Aboriginal inhabitants, the Dharawal people. The beaches were named by Surveyor Robert Dixon who surveyed here in 1827-28 and by 1840, the main beach was still known as Karranulla.

== Gallery ==
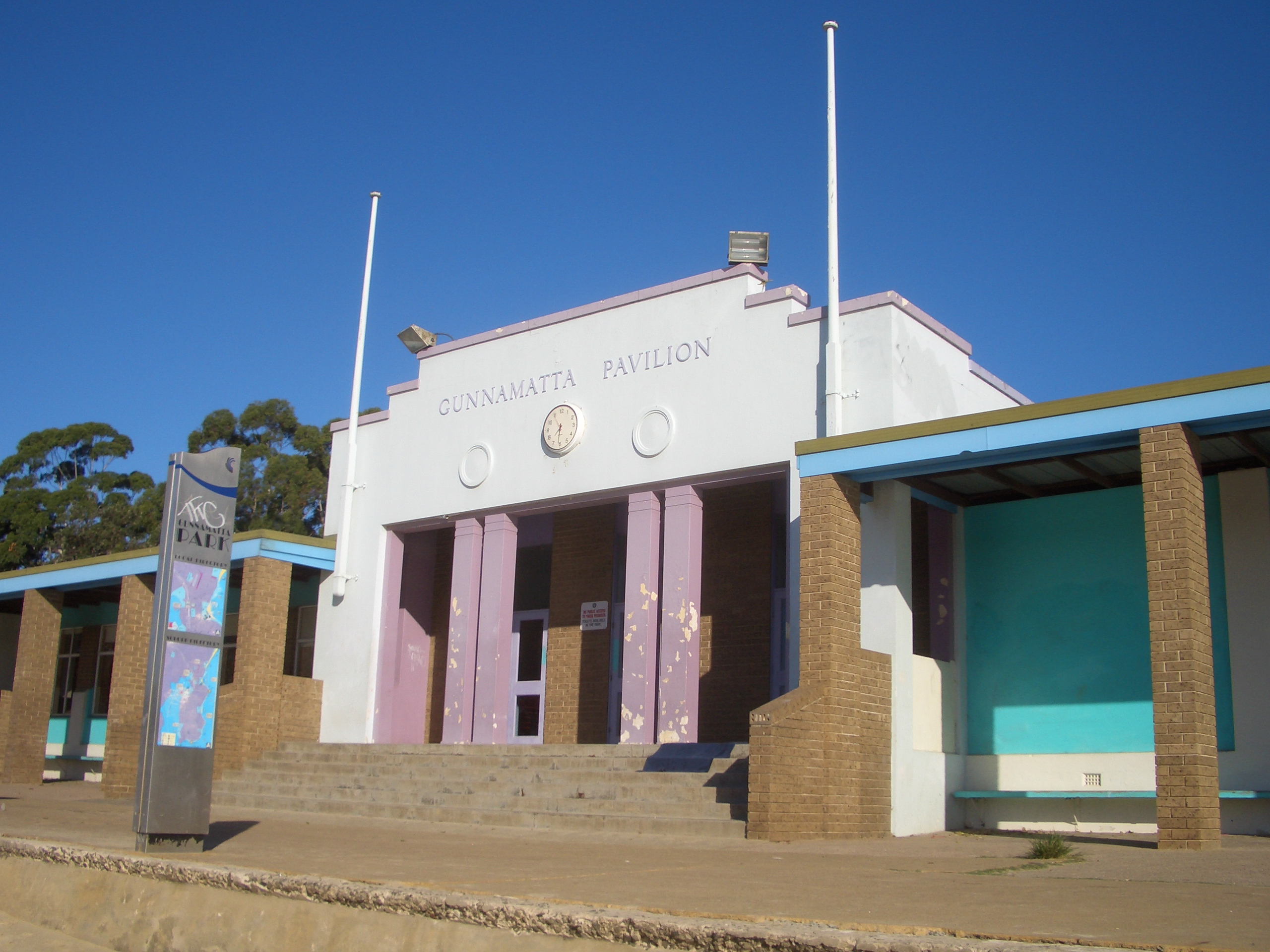
Gunnamatta Pavilion

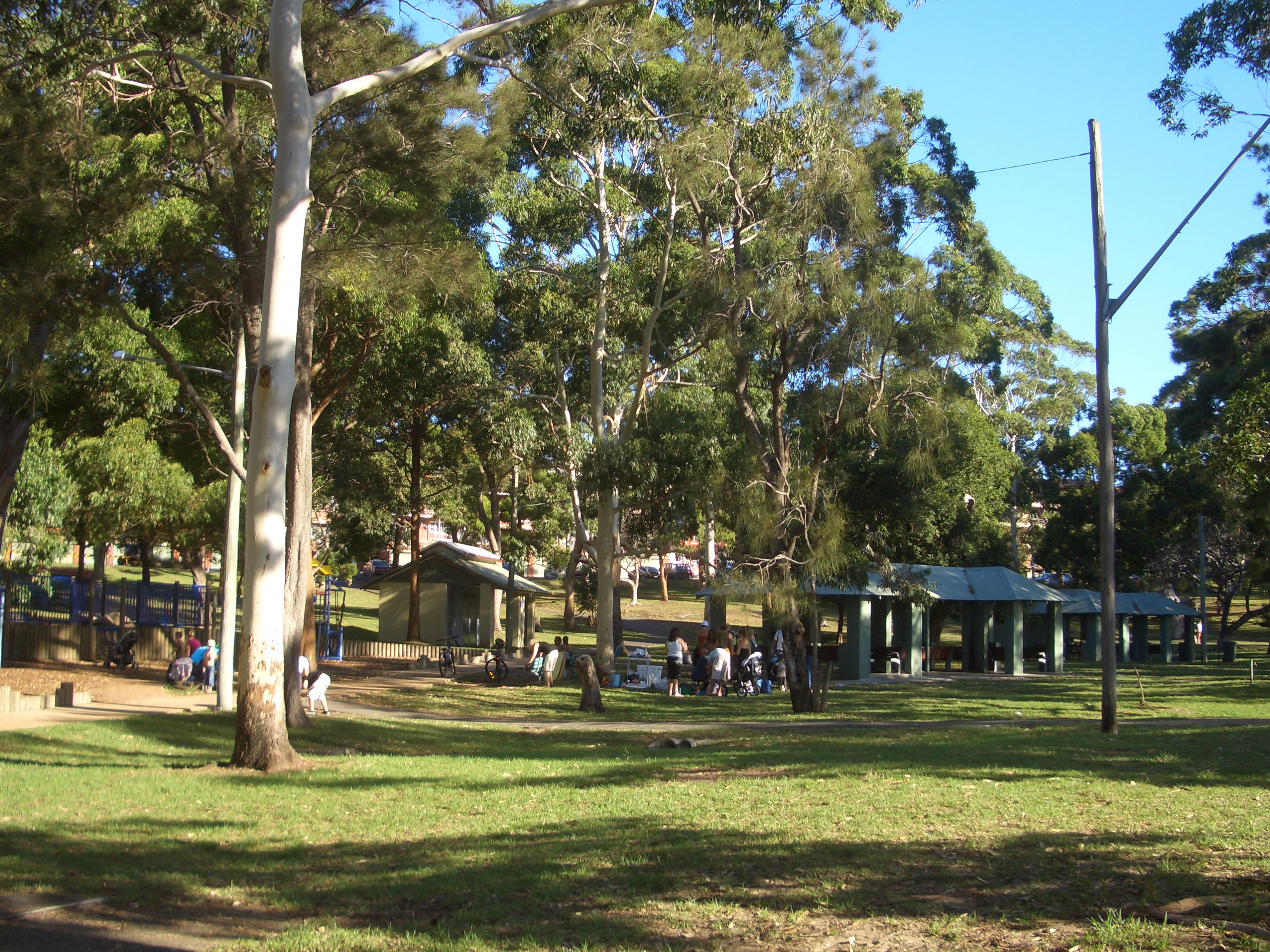
Gunnamatta Park

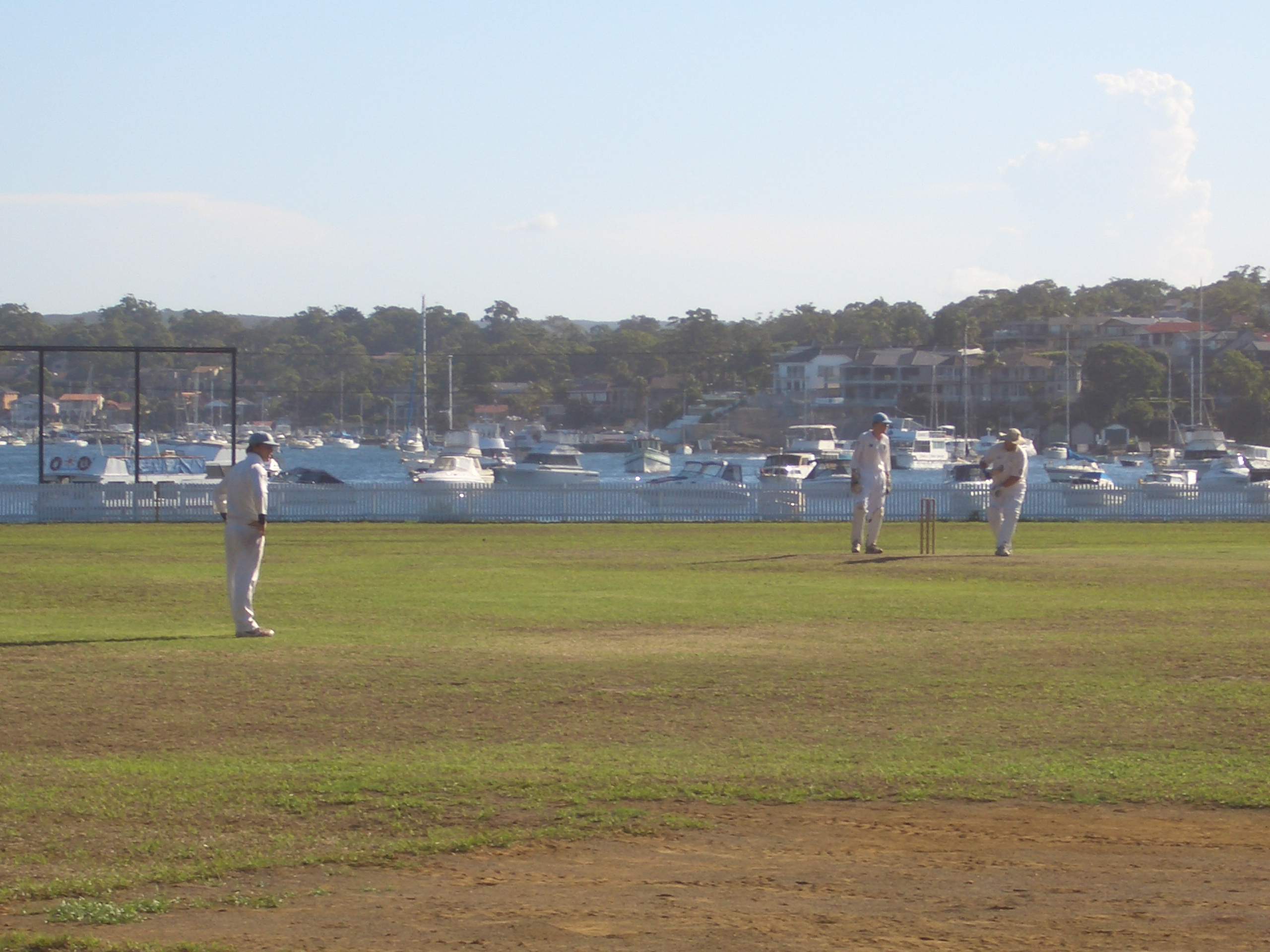
Tonkin Oval, Cronulla

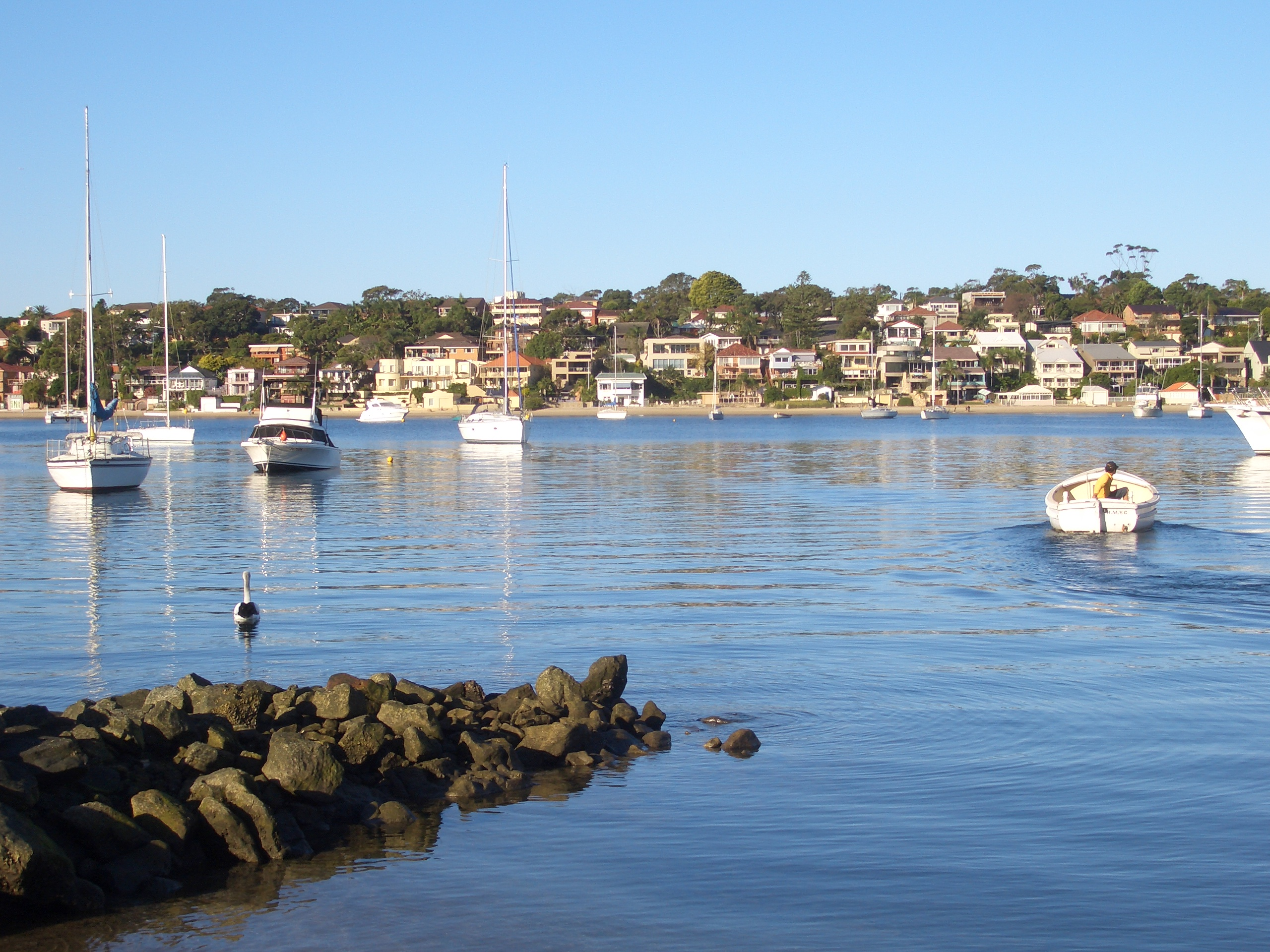
Gunnamatta Bay, view from Burraneer

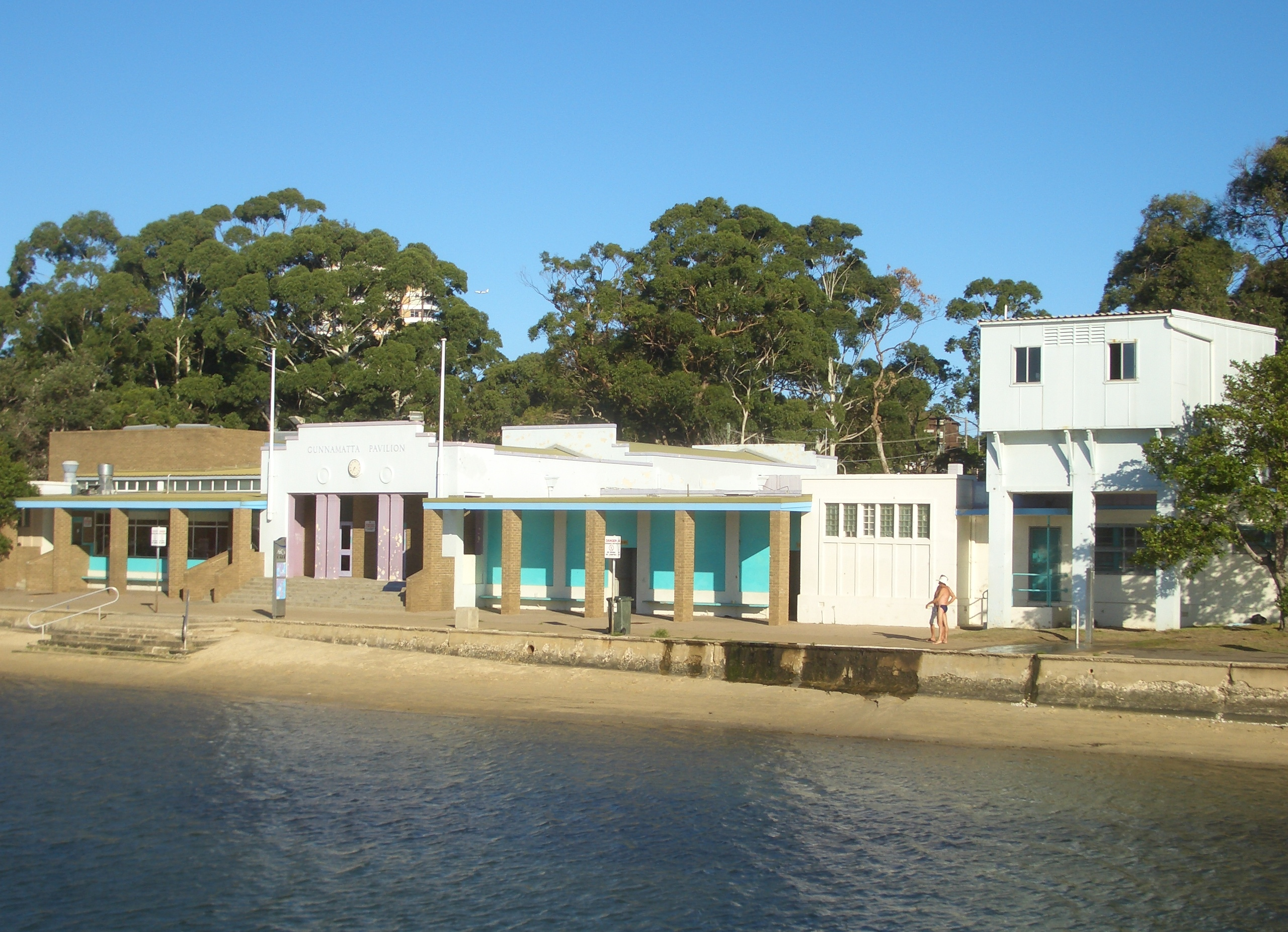
Gunnamatta Pavilion

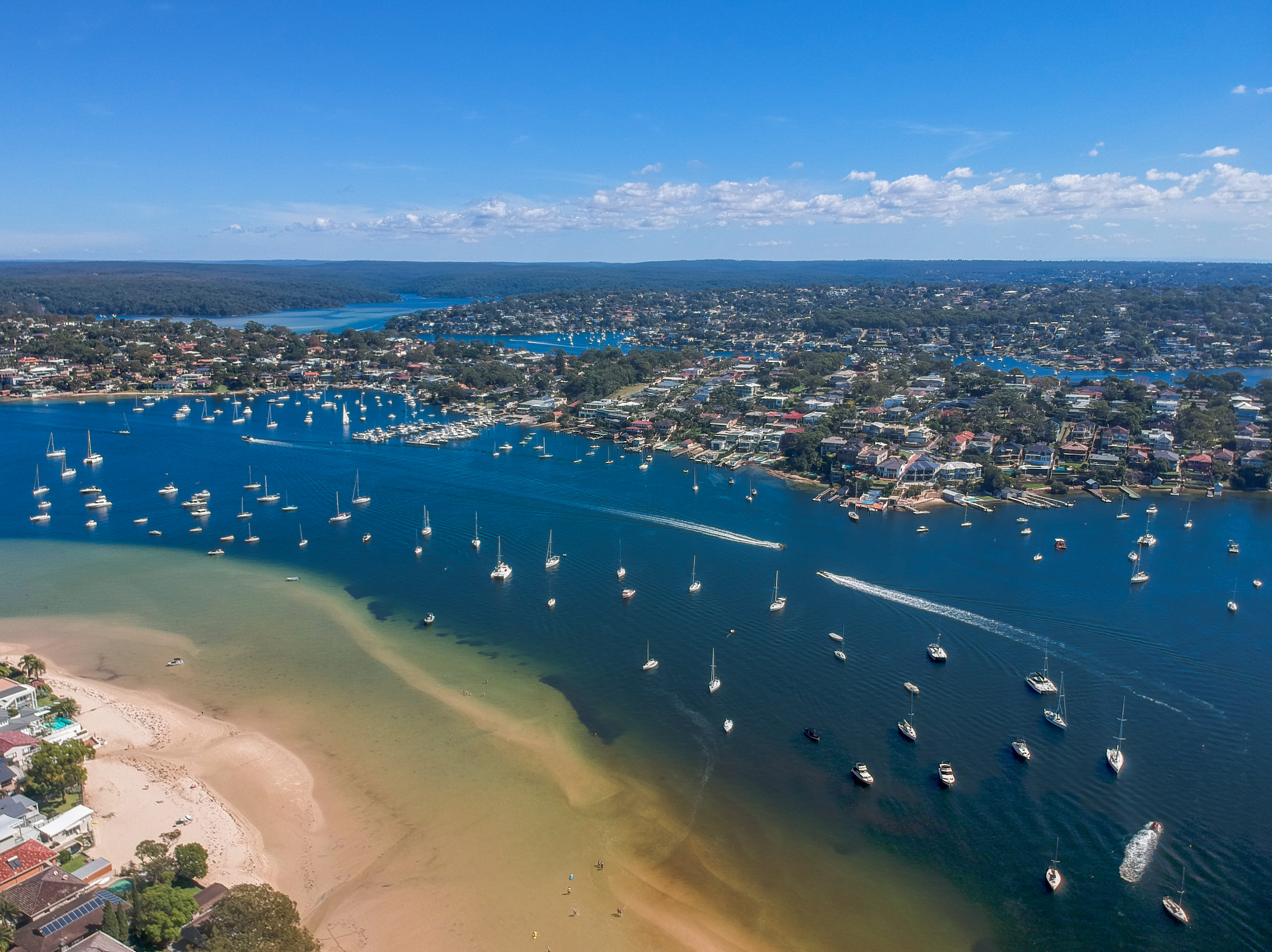
Aerial view

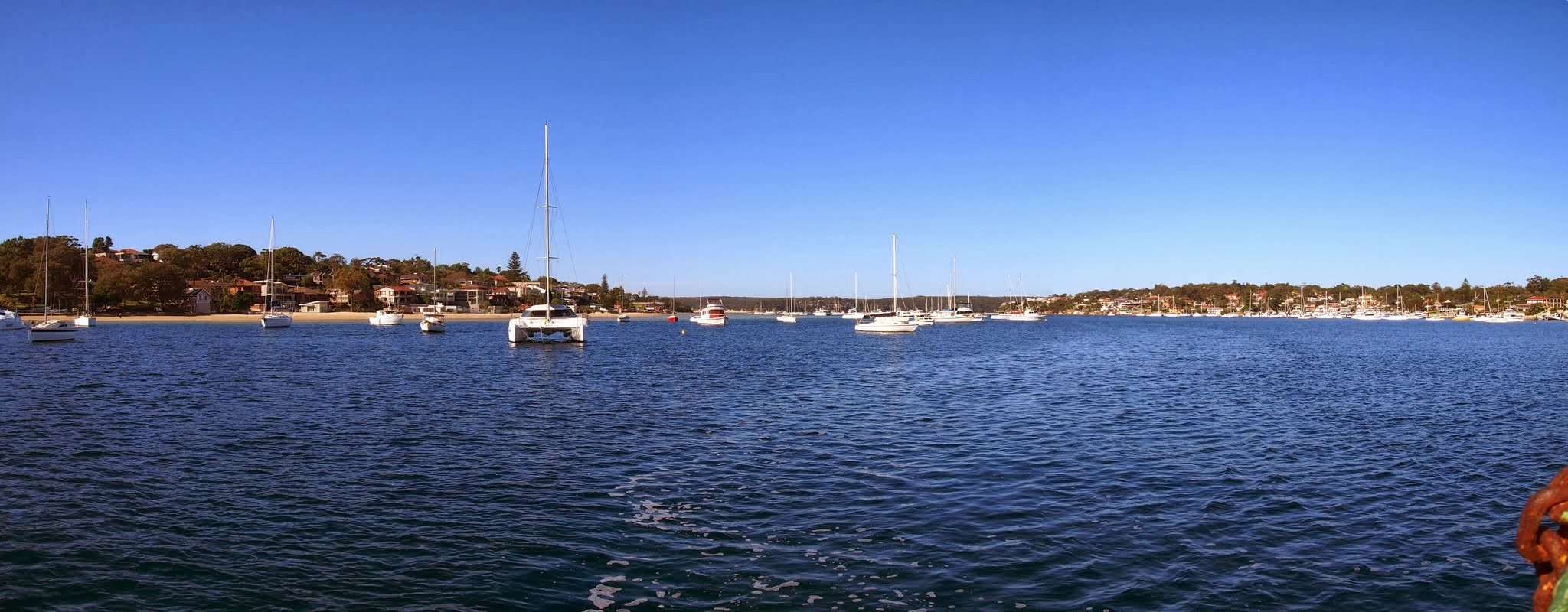
Gunnamatta Bay - Panoramio
