= Sharkies Leagues Club =

Coordinates: 34.038578°S 151.141782°E

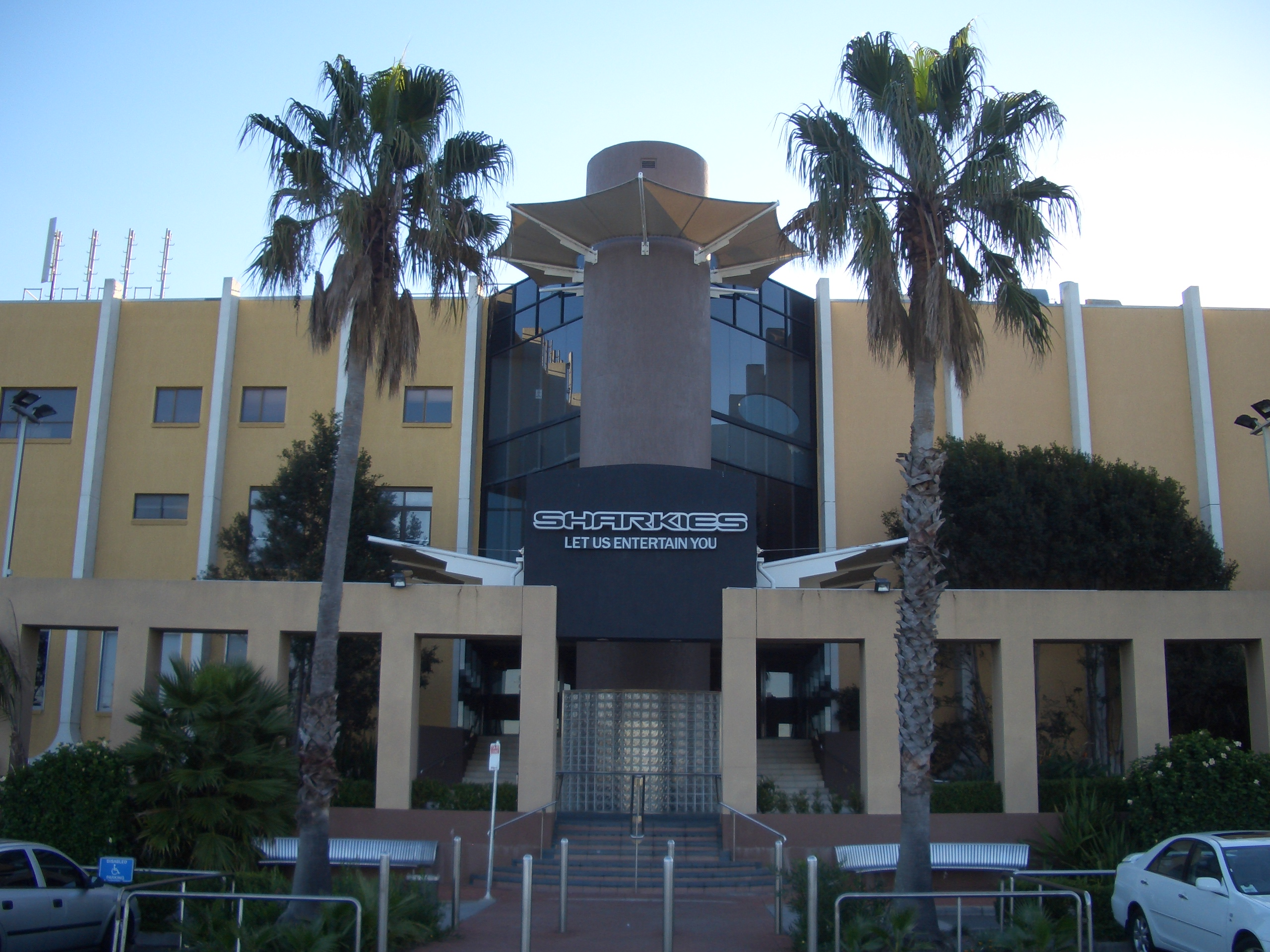
Sharkies Leagues Club

The Cronulla Sutherland Leagues Club, known as Sharkies, is a licensed club that was inaugurated 30 April 1977. The Leagues Club sits beside the Sharks home ground, Endeavour Field and is located on Captain Cook Drive in Woolooware.

== 2011–2026 redevelopment ==
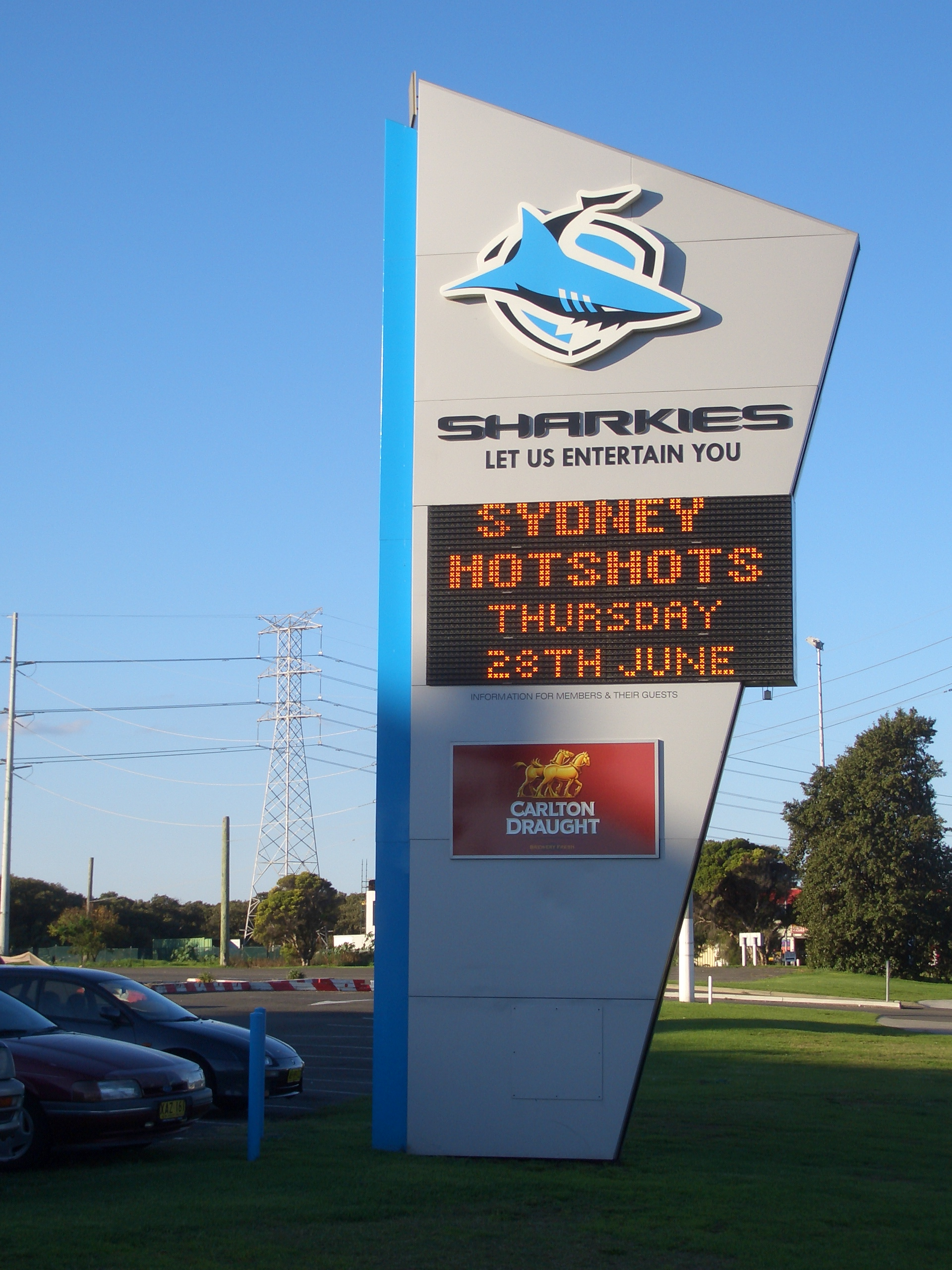
Sharkies Leagues Club

A proposal to develop the land surrounding the Leagues Club was released for community consultation on 29 July 2011. It included proposals for a retail centre, a residential estate, and a refurbishment of Cronulla Sharks' facilities. Development would be undertaken in a joint venture between Bluestone Capital Ventures and the Cronulla-Sutherland Sharks.

In early 2016, Bluestone Capital Ventures submitted further planning to the NSW Department of Planning and Environment. The development's plans included a retail hub, outdoor and exercise areas, parking spaces, a redeveloped Leagues Club, and apartments.

The joint venture partners agreed to reschedule the development of apartments to "capitalise on the strong performing residential market at the time." This meant residential apartments were prioritised, meaning no other facilities were developed throughout stages one, two, and three.

Stage one of the redevelopment began in 2015, with residents moving in after completion in December 2016. In June 2018, following the completion of stage two, the number of residents increased to 725. Stage 3 of the residential centre was finished next, with residents moving in by August 2020.

In 2019, the Cronulla-Sutherland Sharks announced they were selling their stake in the redevelopment to Bluestone Capital for $40 million. The Sharks estimated the value of the renovated Leagues Club at $5.15 million.

Stage 4 was still unfinished by December 2023.

After reaching an agreement with developers, construction on the Leagues Club began in July 2025. The Leagues Club was still unfinished by June 2026.

The Sharkies Leagues Club officially reopened by 7 November 2026.

== See also ==
- List of pubs in Australia
- List of restaurants in Australia
