= Cronulla and National Park Ferry Cruises =

Ferry operator in Southern Sydney

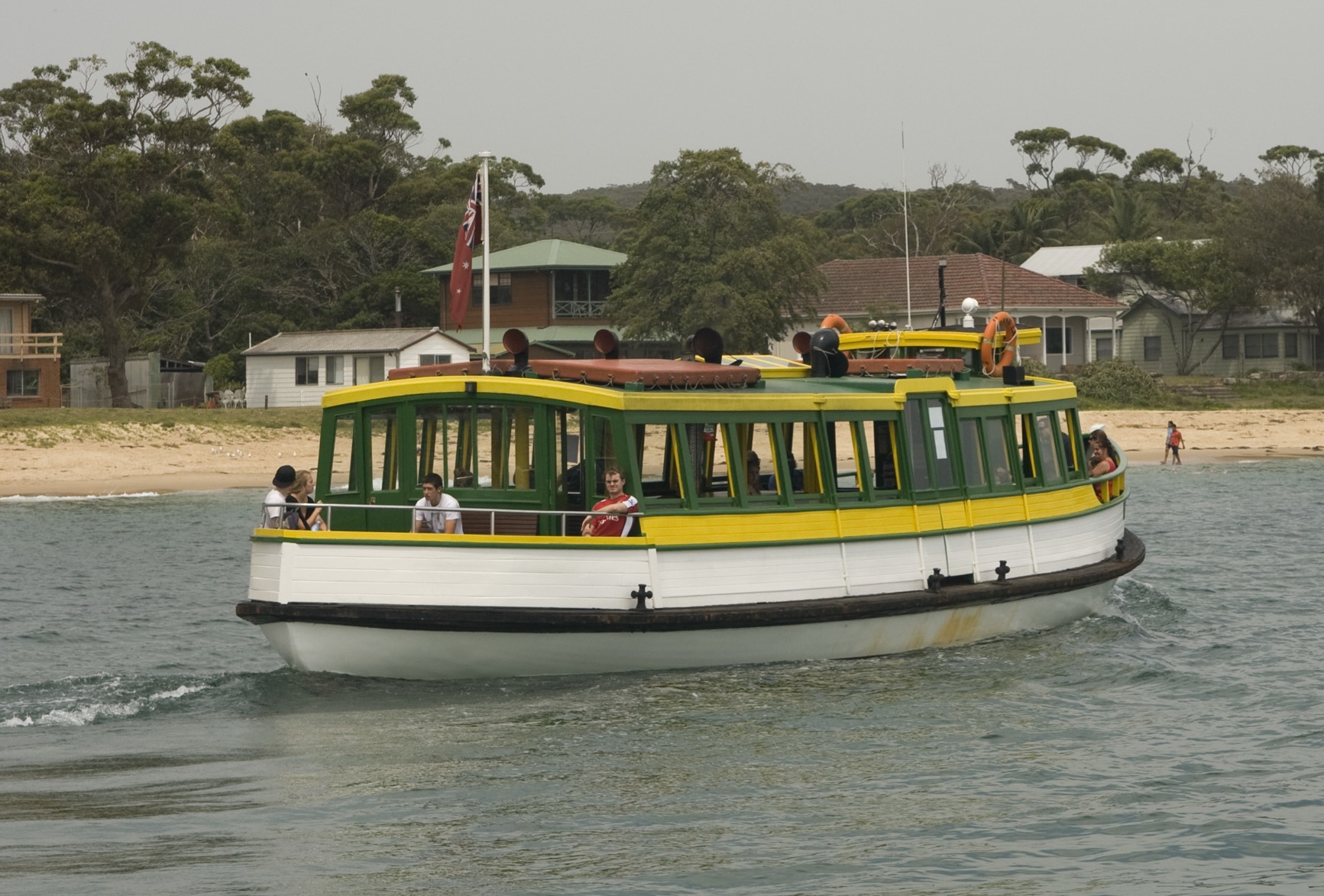
- MV Curranulla in 2010
- Locale: Southern Sydney
- Waterway: Port Hacking
- Transit type: Passenger and cruise ferry
- Owner: Carl Rogan
- Began operation: 1915
- No. of lines: 1
- No. of vessels: 4
- No. of terminals: 2
- Website: www.cronullaferries.com.au

Cronulla and National Park Ferry Cruises is a ferry operator on Port Hacking in Southern Sydney, Australia.

It operates a scheduled service from Cronulla to Bundeena at the northern end of Royal National Park making the ferry service popular with bushwalkers as well as local residents. The company also operates scenic cruises around Port Hacking.

The Cronulla to Bundeena service commenced operating in 1915 when Captain R Ryall commenced operating the service. The business was purchased by HC Mallam in the late 1940s who sold it to Jack Gowland in the late 1960s. It has since been sold a number of times and is now owned by Carl Rogan.

== Fleet ==
Cronulla and National Park Ferry Cruises operate four vessels:

- Curranulla, named after the rowboat used by George Bass and Matthew Flinders to explore Port Hacking. The 53 foot ferry was built by Morrison & Sinclair, Balmain entering service on 12 May 1939, Originally powered by a 3-cylinder K3 12 litre 66HP hand start Kelvin diesel, replaced in 1986 by a 5LW Gardner. Curranulla is the oldest commuter ferry still operating in Australia.
- Tom Thumb III built in 1946 in Forster by Alf Jahnsan as the Alma G powered with a 4LW Gardner engine. Purchased in 1952 by Cliff Mallam and moved to Cronulla where she had her engine converted to a 2-cylinder K2 Kelvin 8 litre 44HP hand-start Diesel engine. Renamed Gymea before becoming the Tom Thumb III in 1982 when repowered with a 5LW Gardner engine.
- Gunnamatta, named after Gunnamatta Bay, was built in 1989 by Broadwater Craft, Nerang as a catamaran to operate cruises
- Port Hacking Explorer II is a cruise vessel
