= Our Lady of Mercy College, Burraneer =

Our Lady of Mercy College

Location
- Burraneer, New South Wales; Australia; 34°03′14″S 151°08′08″E

Information
- Motto: Latin: Sub Tuum Praesidium (Under Your Protection)
- Denomination: Roman Catholic
- Established: 1932
- Principal: Christine Harding
- Grades: 7–10
- Gender: Girls
- Enrolment: ~550
- Houses: Baggot, Coolock, Doyle and Frayne
- Colors: Red, green, blue and yellow
- Slogan: Encouraging Girls, Empowering Women
- Website: olmcburraneer.syd.catholic.edu.au

Our Lady of Mercy Catholic College Burraneer (also OLM or OLMCCB) is an all-girls 7–12 school situated on Burraneer Bay, in Sydney's southern suburbs, Australia. Our Lady of Mercy College, Burraneer is a Newman Selective Roman Catholic School. It was founded by in 1932 by the Sisters of Mercy. In 1960, the college moved to its current location in Burraneer Bay. The current enrolment is ~550.

The college is affiliated with the Australasian Mercy Secondary Schools Association (AMSSA), Shire Combined Catholic Colleges (SCCC), Southern Sydney Combined Catholic Colleges (SSCCC) and NSW Combined Catholic Colleges (NSWCCC).

== History ==
The college was established in 1935 by the Sisters of Mercy (Parramatta) in a cottage at 6 Coast Avenue, Cronulla. The earliest known enrolment was sixteen girls. OLMC operated as a small boarding school until 1939 when it was closed during World War II. It was reopened in 1945 as a small day school, and boarding was discontinued in 1951.

In 1959, the Sisters of Mercy purchased the college's current property at Burraneer Bay, which was officially opened and blessed in 1960. In 1972, the college acquired the property on the northern side of Dominic Street. In the early 1980s, the Sisters of Mercy moved out of the Convent, allowing the school to extend into this part of the building.

In 1989, the College introduced a new uniform, replacing yellow and brown with the current uniform and school colours of blue, red and white.

Extensive building work on the northern side of the grounds was completed in 2003 with the opening of a new multi-purpose centre, The Mercy Centre, along with new music and practice rooms and four general classrooms. Major building work in 2014 and 2015 transformed the Marcy Centre into a performing arts centre with a new stage and two recording studios. The Catherine McAuley building was completed in 2016 and officially opened in 2017, with three science laboratories, four design and technology rooms, five flexible general classrooms and an open learning space.

In 2024 the school accepted their first Year 11 cohort.

== Principals ==
Period	Details
1945–1946	M Casimir Callachor
1947–1952	Jude Cashman
1953–1962	M. Alphonsus Stanley
1963	Agatha Dunne
1964	Anne Ryan
1966	Paulinus Hartigan
1967–1971	M. Immaculata Hegarty
1972–1976	Pauline Smith
1977–1980	Margaret Doyle
1981–2000	Loreto McLeod
2001–2006	Deslee Browne
2007–2010	Christina Trimble
2011–2017	Gilda Pussich
2018–2020	Ann Freeman
2021–2023	Leonie Pearce
2024–Present	Christine Harding
