= Dolans Bay =

Cove in New South Wales, Australia

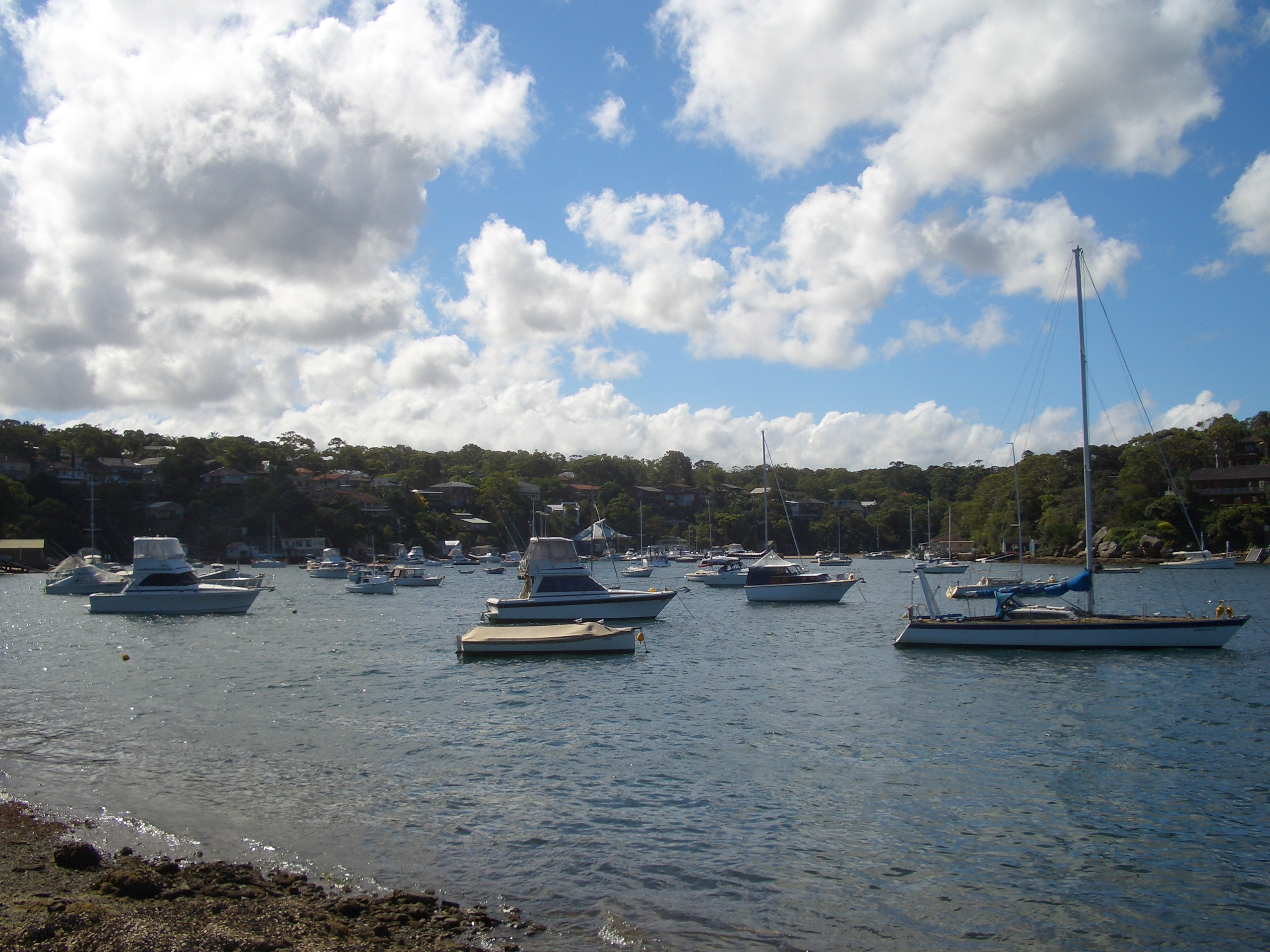
- Dolans Bay, pictured in 2007

- Location of Dolans Bay in New South Wales
- Location: Southern Sydney, New South Wales
- Coordinates: 34°03′55″S 151°08′05″E
- Type: Cove
- Primary outflows: Burraneer Bay
- Basin countries: Australia
- Managing agency: Sutherland Shire Council
- Frozen: never
- Settlements: Caringbah South, Dolans Bay, Port Hacking

The Dolans Bay is a cove on the Burraneer Bay adjacent to the lower estuarine Hacking River of Port Hacking in southern Sydney, in the state of New South Wales, Australia.

== Location and features ==
With a catchment that drains a small number of the most southern suburbs of the Sutherland Shire, Dolans Bay is located as a small cover off Burraneer Bay, near where the Hacking River and Port Hacking estuary meet Gunnamatta Bay and empty into Bate Bay. The bay's catchment area is bound by Port Hacking to the south, Buraneer Bay sub-catchment to the east and north, and Little Turnell Bay sub-catchment to the southwest, and Gannons Bay and Great Turnell Bay sub-catchments to the west. The bay is surrounded by the suburbs of Caringbah South to the north, Dolans Bay and Port Hacking to the southwest, and Lilli Pilli to the west at the bay's junction with the estuary.

Houses overlook the bay and some line the water's edge together with boatsheds. Boats are moored in the bay, which provides protection from the southerly wind. Burraneer Bay features a private marina and slipway with full repair facilities. Notable residents that have lived in the area surrounding Dolans Bay include cricket players Ricky Ponting and Glenn McGrath.

Dolans Bay was named after a land owner in the area called Dominick Dolan. In 1858 Mary and Andrew Webster paid 108 pounds and 15 shillings plus a yearly peppercorn quit rent for their land in this area. The Websters sold their land to Dominick Dolan in 1863.
