= Fernleigh, Caringbah South =

- Location within Sydney Location within Australia
- 34°03′37″S 151°07′58″E
- Location: 44-46 Fernleigh Road, Caringbah South, New South Wales, Australia

History
- Built: 1821

Site notes
- Architectural style: Old Colonial Georgian

New South Wales Heritage Register
- Official name: Fernleigh; Mandalay; York House
- Type: State heritage (built)
- Designated: 2 April 1999
- Reference no.: 302
- Type: House
- Category: Residential buildings (private)

Fernleigh is a heritage-listed former boatshed and homestead and now residence located at 44-46 Fernleigh Road, Caringbah South, New South Wales, a suburb of Sydney, Australia. It is also known as Mandalay and York House. The property is privately owned. It was added to the New South Wales State Heritage Register on 2 April 1999.

== History ==
Fernleigh is believed by Sutherland historians to have been completed in 1821 for Thomas Laycock Jr., who, while himself mostly resident at his property Kelvin at Bringelly, built the house for his second wife, Margaret Connell, and the six children of his first marriage to Isabella Bunker of Collingwood, Liverpool. The home is believed to be the first constructed in the Sutherland area and has been an envied point of interest for one hundred years. However, in 2012 it was claimed that the Thomas Connell Laycock, espoused by Bruce Watt in Magnificent Fernleigh, was a typographical error and the correct name is in fact John Connell Laycock.

The first Crown Land sales took place in the Caringbah-Miranda area (then unnamed) in 1856–88. During this period (in 1858) John Connell Laycock bought this (parcel number 58) block of land, Lot 13, 16 hectares (40 acres), for A£45. He also bought other large tracts of land in the Caringbah/Burraneer Bay areas, as did his uncle John Connell Junior. John Connell Laycock was a Member of the NSW Legislative Assembly, serving on no less than fifteen committees over a period of seven years. He also owned land in Yamba and was a quarantine keeper at Bradleys Head in 1878. It was through him that Thomas Holt was first acquainted with Sutherland Shire. Laycock and his son escorted Holt around his Shire properties and Holt liked what he saw. Laycock was grandson of John Connell, an original settler at Kurnell. The name Kurnell is acknowledged as a corruption of the Connell family name.

In 1860 Laycock sold it to Holt who began acquiring as much land in the Shire as he could. Eventually Holt controlled most of it (c. 5,100 hectares (12,500 acres)), including the majority of Laycock's estate and the land where Fernleigh is located. The date on which a large portion of his Sutherland Estate was acquired was 31 December 1862. Holt was a life member of the NSW Legislative Council and served on over twenty committees. He was also a successful wool buyer, investing in property, and farmed near Liverpool. He was a director of gold mining, insurance and railway companies. Throughout his life he acquired pastoral interests with others totalling 1,200,000 hectares (3,000,000 acres) in NSW and Queensland from 1851 to 1880. Retired from business as a wool buyer in 1854 he retained pastoral interest and most directorships. He was Colonial Treasurer for a brief time. He sold some of his runs after the gold rush and in 1861 bought an estate extending from Botany Bay to Port Hacking including James Cook's landing place, where he erected an obelisk in the centenary year. He also tried raising sheep on pastures sown with imported grass and then cattle, scientific oyster-farming, timber-getting and coal-mining, each without success. He campaigned for the damming of the George's River to supply Sydney with water but the NSW Government rejected his scheme.

A report Holt commissioned his property manager, R. C. Walker to prepare in 1868 on the extent and viability of his large estate summarised the Burraneer Bay property thus: "40 acres on east side of Dolan's Bay, in Burrameer Bay. This is a block of very thickly timbered land, with a great deal of scrub on it. Nothing has yet been done to it either in ringbarking or scrubbing. The soil is ironstone clay and sandy soil but very rocky. There is a fine view of the Port Hacking River from it and it would make a very good building site".

Holt sold it in 1873 to Charles York. The locality sketch attached to the certificate of title does not indicate any improvements on the site. York bought the land for a "country retreat", taking perhaps one or two years to complete a stone cottage. He originally named it "York House" and it was in the Georgian Revival style. Charles York died in 1880. His widow Emma transferred title in 1883 to Thomas James York of Pyrmont Bridge.

The Gannon family acquired the property in 1888. It is believed they altered the building and renamed it Fernleigh (in 1889). William Gannon owned the Union Hotel in Tempe and his wife was proprietor of Petty's Hotel nearby. His father Michael Gannon and his sons William and Joseph were very supportive of all sporting activities held in the area. Gannon's Forest now known as Hurstville, was named after this family. They owned it until early 1905 when the estate was again subdivided and sold. The remaining portion of the land containing the Fernleigh residence was still some 8 acres in area with an orchard north of the house and several large paddocks to the south and west. Members of the Gannon family have resided here for a period of time. Fernleigh was shown in a 1/1905 estate vendor plan (the first to show improvements on the property) with balconies wrapping around two sides and a substantial rear extension, now the formal living room, bathroom and pantry, but not the sunroom. An outbuilding to its west, being the kitchen and servants' quarters, which have now been incorporated into the house, an orchard to its north (on what is now 38-42b Fernleigh Road), a boat shed further north, in front of what is now 2 Coonabarabran Place, three small boatsheds further north, in front of what is now 1 and 3 Coonabarabran Place, stables on what is now the eastern side of 60 and 62 Fernleigh Road, various sheds along what is now the southern part of 62 and 64a Fernleigh Road, and further south what appear to be animal pens on what is now the eastern part of 68 and 70 Fernleigh Road.

The house had significant alterations in this period. The verandah was extended down the southern and northern sides using corrugated asbestos sheeting. Horse stalls at the southern side rear were removed and servants' quarters which originally were in a separate building were roofed over and joined to the main building, creating a large living room. Dormer windows were added to the house's front to create two small attic bedrooms.

In March 1905 Mrs Gannon sold lots 8, 9 & 10 to James Taylor Austin. There were no improvements on this part of the land. He is recorded as living at Port Hacking in July 1920. This may relate to the Burraneer Bay address. Mrs Gannon (who was living in the two hotels in Tempe), died on 5 September 1906. Much of the property's contents were sold off. In December 1908 her remaining lands were transferred to Robert Owen Gribben, her nephew. He sold various lots until his death in 1910. Part Lot 1 (the subject site) was sold to Charles John Miller on 15 April 1910; part to Otto Fredrick Wunderlich on the same date. Wunderlich was a well-known Sydney socialite and managing director of Wunderlich Ltd. Part Lot 1 was also sold to Edwin Crescence Cook on the same date. He was a Lieutenant in the NSW Defence Force in 1897. Part Lot 1 was sold again to George Cornish Dwyer of Glebe on 17 April 1911. By 1914 Edwin Crescence Cook held the parcel of land that is the subject site (Burraneer Bay marina) and Fernleigh. On 11 September 1914 it was sold to Rose Annie Isabella Rofe, wife oa John Rofe, Sydney solicitor. The Rofes did not reside at Fernleigh, or not full-time. Until she died in 1931, their residential address was in Stanmore. Mr Rofe died three weeks later.

In 1932 the property passed to two of their sons, Alfred and Edgar, both solicitors. In 1935 it was sold to Harry Peel, merchant. He took over an importing business of his father's, living in Coogee at that time - the family were keen sailors. Since the early 1930s there has been a regular motor boat race from Rose Bay (and later, Broken Bay) to Port Hacking for which the "Harry Peel Trophy" was awarded. Peel and his wife were both members of the Port Hacking branch of the Royal Motor Yacht Club, where they actively raced their speed boat, Baltimore. He resided in Helensburgh. Peel may have been related to the Gannon family by marriage.

Fernleigh Road was extended further south to loop around and join up with Gannons Road. The subdivision pattern was greatly fragmented undergoing major changes from the 1905 subdivision. During this period Fernleigh underwent several changes with a ballroom being added in 1920 and an Art Deco style bathroom in the 1930s.

Mr and Mrs Errol Alcott bought the property from Peel in 1947; and it has been in the Alcott family since then.

The property has water access.

Part of Fernleigh is known to have operated as a commercial marina and slipway since the early 1940s. At that time the site was known as "The Three Pines Boatshed". There is anecdotal evidence of the slipping of vessels from 1949. The first tender owned by the boatshed was built in 1945 and is still in use by the marina today. It is believed that during the 1950s and 1960s the NSW Police regularly called upon the vessel to assist with search and rescue activities on the Port Hacking River.

The Three Pines Boatshed part of the original holding, now called Burraneer Bay Marina, was subdivided off in the 1970s. In 1976 the first marina jetty and mooring pens were constructed. The first vessel to lease one of the moorings is still there today. A number of marina support facilities are provided, such as vessel maintenance, slipway facilities, fuel and sewer pump-out. The marine presently contains 72 over-water commercial berths, 31 swing moorings distributed throughout Burraneer Bay and slipway capacity on two slipways for up to three vessels at any time. The marina is presently home for two NSW Maritime vessels that regularly patrol the Port Hacking River.

Apparently the launch of "Tie Me Kangaroo Down, Sport", the quintessential Australian folk song of Alcott family friend Rolf Harris, was held on Fernleigh's front lawn. The present Fernleigh Road was named after the house. A proposed additional 35 new berths and refurbishment of the marina was proposed in 2012.

== Description ==
The layout of the main part of the house follows a typical square Old Colonial Georgian format. There are four rooms divided down the middle by a wide hallway. Originally the two rooms on the southern side were bedrooms and the two on the northern side were dining and sitting rooms. Walls are constructed from 46-centimetre (18 in) hand-hewn sandstone blocks. The slate roof is original. Chimney pots also are Victorian.

The house's details suggest several stages of alteration / extension and repair. It has seven bedrooms. The stone was cut on the property, and signs of the quarrying may still be seen at the back of the house. A stone lintel over the front door says 1821. The timber used was cedar, obtained from a small stand on a nearby ridge. The dormer windows do not appear in an early photograph of the home, while the line of the original veranda which extended across the eastern facade only may be seen under the current veranda. The courtyard between the home and its formerly separate kitchen block has been enclosed to create a large sitting room.

Beneath each of the main rooms is a cellar with a trap door. This construction created coolness in summer as well as providing cool-storage near the kitchen area. The kitchen wing was originally separated from the living area by a flag-stoned courtyard, but many years ago this was enclosed by a previous owner, and the flagged stone flooring of both kitchen and courtyard were wood-floored.

The property has water access. A ballroom was added in 1920 and an art deco bathroom in the 1930s. The Three Pines Boatshed, part of the original holding and now called Burraneer Bay Marina, was subdivided off in the 1970s.

=== Modifications and dates ===
c. 1905 or prior, significant alterations to the house - verandah extended down southern and northern sides with corrugated asbestos sheeting. Horse stalls on southern side rear were removed and the servants' quarters which originally were in a separate building were roofed over and joined to the main building, creating a large living room. Dormer windows were added to the front, to create two small attic bedrooms.

The main living room has had a 1920s makeover. A ballroom was added in 1920 and an Art Deco bathroom in the 1930s (or 1940s).

The Three Pines Boatshed, part of the original holding and now called Burraneer Bay Marina, was subdivided off in the 1970s.

== Heritage listing ==
As at 17 August 2012, Fernleigh was believed by Sutherland historians to have been completed in 1821 for Thomas Laycock Junior, who, while himself mostly resident at his property Kelvin at Bringelly, built the house for his second wife Margaret Connell and the six children of his first marriage to Isabella Bunker of Collingwood, Liverpool. The home is believed to be the first constructed in the Sutherland area and has been an envied point of interest for one hundred years.

Fernleigh was listed on the New South Wales State Heritage Register on 2 April 1999.

== See also ==
- Australian residential architectural styles
