= Lyons House, Sydney =

Lyons House
- Location within Sydney
- Interactive map of Lyons House
- 34°04′05″S 151°07′42″E
- Location: 733 Port Hacking Road, Dolans Bay, New South Wales, Australia

History
- Built: 1967

Site notes
- Architects: Robin Boyd; Marion Hall Best (window coverings); Bruce Mackenzie (landscape design)

New South Wales Heritage Register
- Official name: Lyons House; Robin Boyd designed house; Marion Hall Best interiors; Bruce Mackenzie landscaping; Romberg & Boyd
- Type: State heritage (complex / group)
- Designated: 19 December 2014
- Reference no.: 1930
- Type: House
- Category: Residential buildings (private)
- Builders: C. H. and C.R. Ellis; McConnel, Smith and Johnson (site supervision)

Lyons House is a heritage-listed private residence at 733 Port Hacking Road, Dolans Bay, New South Wales, Australia. It was designed in 1967 by Robin Boyd; Marion Hall Best designed the window coverings; and Bruce Mackenzie designed the landscape.

It was built during 1967 by C.H. and C.R. Ellis, with site supervision by McConnel, Smith and Johnson. It is also known as the Robin Boyd designed house, Marion Hall Best interiors, Bruce Mackenzie landscaping and Romberg & Boyd. It was added to the New South Wales State Heritage Register on 19 December 2014.

== History ==
=== Aboriginal land ===
Most archaeological evidence relates to Indigenous occupation in the area from about 3000 – 2000 years ago. People living between the south of Botany Bay and Nowra were of the Dharawal language group. The northernmost clan of the Dharawal speakers located near Kurnell, including those around the Port Hacking River, were the Gweagal. The indigenous people living in this area enjoyed many food resources and the mild climate of the area. Many midden sites provide evidence of the use of sea foods as well as reptiles and mammals from the bushland. Fish hooks were made from turban shells and fishing lines and nets from bark and native grasses. Timber provided bark for huts, canoes, coolamons, and lomandra leaves were woven together to make bags.

In early 1770, Dharawal people of the southern coastal area between Nowra and Kurnell observed a large "white bird" (oral tradition of the local people) or floating island. This was Captain Cook's ship, the Endeavour, as it passed along the coast towards the headlands of Botany Bay (Kamay). The Endeavour lay anchor opposite the location of a small bark hut "village" on the southern shores of present-day Kurnell, a few kilometres north of present-day Port Hacking. It is understood that Cook's bold arrival and landing was a severe breach of Indigenous etiquette.

The location of the Endeavour's landfall and Cook's claim of the east coast of the continent for Britain is now commonly known as Captain Cook's Landing Place and has been included on the National Heritage List within the "Kurnell Peninsular" listing.

=== Colonisation of Sutherland Shire ===
The land where Lyons House stand forms part of the historic property owned by Thomas Holt known as the Holt-Sutherland Estate.

In 1815, Governor Macquarie had made a grant of 700 acres of land to James Birnie at Kurnell, just north of Port Hacking. In 1821 a grant of 1000 acres was made nearby at Quibray Bay to John Connell. The first Crown Land sales took place in the Caringbah-Miranda area in 1856–88. At this time John Connell's grandson, John Connell Laycock, bought large tracts of land in the area including the present day site of Fernleigh in South Caringbah.

John Connell Laycock was a Member of the NSW Parliament where he was friendly with Thomas Holt. Laycock escorted Thomas Holt around his shire properties and Holt liked what he saw.

In 1861, Thomas Holt purchased some 4,600 acres of land between the George's River and Port Hacking. In the following years he consolidated his holdings, more than doubling this original acreage. In September 1881 some 12,200 acres were leased to the Holt-Sutherland Estate Land Company, which dominated the development of the area for many years. A Richardson & Wrench land sale map in 1901 offering to subdivide part of the Holt Sutherland Estate shows the site of 5 acres now containing Lyons House as "not for sale" and owned by a Mr Simpson.

The earliest aerial photographs of the site, taken in 1930, show a building there. Aerial photographs of 1961 evidence the site as bushland. By 1970, aerial photographs show the construction of the current building known as Lyons House.

=== Architect Robin Boyd ===
Australian architect, author and critic Robin Boyd (1919–1971), was one of the most influential Australian architects of the twentieth century. In 1969, Boyd was awarded the gold medal by the R.A.I.A. He was a Life Fellow of the Royal Australian Institute of Architects and an Honorary Fellow of the American Institute of Architects. He gave the prestigious Boyer Lecture in 1967 and in the same year was granted an Honorary Doctorate of Letters by the University of New England.

Boyd authored or co-authored twelve books and also wrote prolifically for journals, newspapers and magazines. At the time the Lyons House was conceived and built, Boyd was heavily influenced by Japanese design.

In 1962, Boyd had published a biography of Kenzo Tange, a work which discusses Japanese architecture generally as well as the work of Tange himself. In 1968, he published New Directions in Japanese Architecture. He died in October 1971, aged 52.

=== Client ===
In 1967, the orthopedic surgeon Dr William Lyons, was seeking an architect to design a home for the block of land he had recently bought in Port Hacking. Following an unsuccessful interview with Harry Seidler, Lyons wrote to Robin Boyd in Melbourne, expressing his admiration for his writings and asking if he could recommend an architect in Sydney. Boyd responded by saying that he would be happy to take on the commission since he would be passing through Sydney regularly on his way to and from Montreal where he was designing the Australian Pavilion for World Expo.

In addition, Boyd engaged Bill Smith of McConnell Smith & Johnson to administer the building contract on a day-to-day level. Robin Boyd and Dr Lyons worked on the design for the Lyons House in a collaborative manner, both in person and by correspondence (which Dr Lyons has carefully retained). Dr Lyons remarked, "You give an architect a problem, not an answer.".

Geoffrey Serle later commented:, 'These were very congenial clients, with artistic and intellectual interests in keeping with Boyd's, as were a large proportion of his customers who had singled him out on the basis of his radical reputation.'

Before engaging the architect, Lyons spent a year thinking about how he actually lived. He produced a short brief that focused on elements such as a pool to be integrated into the house design, maximisation of views and separation of living areas. The family kept six cars at that time and ease of parking was another consideration in the design. Dr Lyons' first wife was musical and provision was made for this with original plans showing a grand piano in a music room and a rise in the floor level between the family room and the dining room, which enabled a "stage effect" (Dr Lyons' words) for small performances.

=== Design of Lyons House ===
The style of Lyons House is described as Late Twentieth Century Organic style with a strong influence of the Post-War Melbourne Regional style of which Boyd was a key-practitioner in the post-World War II period. The NSW Institute of Architects' nomination for the house in 1999 described it as, a "rational structuralist" design approach. (RAIA, 1999). When Boyd visited the site for the first time, he asked to stand on the roof of Dr Lyons' car, took in the superb views and said "We'll have to go up."

Boyd also recognised that excavating into solid sandstone for a pool would be expensive so he proposed that the pool be built above ground and the house built in wings around it to maximise views and allow for cars to be parked beneath cantilevered wings. The emphasis was not on how the house appeared from the outside but on the views out from within.

Dr Lyons noted Boyd did his drawings quickly, based on these initial ideas, within a few weeks. Lyons tells a story about his musical wife wanting to have a place for her Queen Anne dressing table; when Boyd's best compromise was to propose building it a special box for it projecting out from the bedroom, she gave in and Boyd was appreciative of what he called the "armistice". Given the nature of the brief, the site and the architect, the structural solution was always going to be a dominant part of the design. The diagonal timber struts used to support the cantilevered upper floor are an important part of the design, as are the projecting rafters. Such details are consistent with Boyd's theory of structural expression: "Architecture is good building and building is good structure. Therefore it seems axiomatic to me that the main elements of the structure should be as apparent in a work of architecture as the words, sentences and paragraphs in a work of writing. Understanding the building is essential to a proper enjoyment of it".

Boyd chose the materials and finishes including the use of clinker bricks internally and externally. The fabric and finishes provide an important means by which Boyd's design intentions are brought to fruition. The dark clinker bricks of the ground floor provide a solid visual grounding for the overhanging Oregon timber-finished first floor walls (stained grey to be in harmony with surrounding gum trees). These were materials which Boyd believed to be 'rather "back to the forest" - a natural look which suits Australia.'

Despite the apparently "basic" nature of the rough-sawn exposed timber construction throughout, the detailing is superb and testament to the building workers' skill. The builder Bob Ellis had worked with Alan Jack & Cottier and had helped build Jack House in Wahroonga. The extensive use of timber exudes a warmth to the building that Boyd was keen to create: 'I continue to shun artificial, decorative warmth, while finding pleasure in the sight and touch of almost any material that is not trying to look like another one.'

The influence of Japanese architecture is also apparent, particularly in the interior with its sliding doors with frosted glass, the almost tatami-mat appearance of the carpet and in the exterior deep eaves. Boyd's design is also based upon rigid planning. A nine-foot grid forms the basis for the proportions used in this home and is strictly enforced, ensuring a visual consistency throughout its many aspects and vistas. Lyons followed up Boyd's recommendations of Marion Hall Best for advice on the interiors and Bruce Mackenzie for the landscape design. Dr Lyons also sought out Leslie Walford for advice on lighting design. Hall Best was a leading interior designer in Australia at the time. She has been described as "a woman who thinks architecturally and has a conscious regard for the value and importance of space". She said: "I have a great respect for the architect, for the spatial values of the house. I feel responsible to carry through the ideas that have their beginning in a line drawn on a plan. I never want to lose the bones of an idea by overwhelming it with decoration."

In Lyons House, Hall Best's enduring design contribution is the use of simple match-stick blinds which allow for light to come in and for residents to see out, but not for people to see in. The blinds are unobtrusive in rooms where there are so many windows that using curtains would have been all-dominating. Such blinds were used by Hall Best in the courtyard of her own Sydney home.

Similarly, Bruce Mackenzie was arguably Australia's leading Modern Movement landscape architect of the late 20th century. It is interesting that Mackenzie specified some exotic species for the landscape design as well as natives. Mackenzie is best known for his later design work which focused exclusively on Australian native plantings. The Lyons House has been documented and critically acclaimed in several books and journals as an example of Robin Boyd's strong design philosophy and response to site conditions. Although he designed many residences in Victoria, Lyons House is the only significant work by Robin Boyd to survive intact in NSW. Boyd's other known design in NSW, the Black Dolphin Hotel commissioned by David Yencken in Merimbula on the South Coast, has been severely impacted.

In 2014, Lyons House continues to be occupied by the original client, Dr Lyons, and his family.

== Description ==
Setting

The Lyons House is located at the southeast end of the Dolan's Bay peninsula overlooking the Port Hacking River and the Royal National Park in the Sutherland Shire in the southern suburbs of Sydney. The house lot is irregularly shaped on a lot approximately 1500 square metres which forms the boundary for the SHR listing. The house is positioned high on a hill overlooking two bays on a block of land composed largely of sandstone. This solid rock foundation, combined with the client's desire for a swimming pool, adequate car parking and wish to make the most of the panoramic water views, provided the rationale for Boyd's decision to orient the living area of the house around an elevated concrete pool. This design solution also avoided the need for costly excavation. As Geoffrey Turnbull has noted, 'Boyd would often determine the character of the whole design from an aspect of the client's programme, combined here with the nature of the site.'

Landscaping

The property has no indigenous vegetation. All was planted by Mackenzie or by the owners since occupation. Some of the original Mackenzie plantings, which included both native and exotic species, did not last long (e.g. native rosemary, Westringia fruticosa hedges). These have been replanted with replacements (e.g. lily pilly hedging - Syzygium spp./cv) which provide a similar effect in terms of scale and appearance. Lyons brought in 150 tons of soil to build a slight mound in the front yard which filled a natural seepage hollow and allowed for some trees and gardens to be planted. Chief components of the original Mackenzie landscape design are a drift of eucalypts on the front lawn's eastern side (spotted gum, Corymbia maculata; lemon-scented gum, C.citriodora) and ironbark (Eucalyptus sideroxylon/E.crebra?), low hedges which flank the western driveway edge and the pull-in car parking bay in front of the house. The rear outlook towards the river is essentially open lawn with some low terracing and shrubs on the edges. Because of a need for privacy / screening relative to neighbours on the south, earlier shrub plantings on that boundary have been replaced with lily pilly (Syzygium spp./cv.). The gardens have been well maintained over the last thirty years, and form a fundamental part of any visit to the Lyons House. "The gardens contribute and complement the native landscape setting, with plants including banksia ericifolia, melaleuca armillaris, and eucalyptus maculata. Driveway areas are finished with blue metal screenings rolled into bitumen, graveled areas to immediate house surrounds and lawn areas of couch turf." http://www.sydneyarchitecture.com/EAS/EAS12.htm)

House exterior

Lyons House was designed by Robin Boyd, principal with the Melbourne-based architectural firm, Romboyd and Boyd. The house is two-storeys in height, centred around an elevated swimming pool, and is constructed in the Late Twentieth Century Organic style with a strong influence of the Post-War Melbourne Regional style of which Boyd was a key-practitioner in the post-World War II period. The swimming pool and its wide rim, located in the centre (courtyard) of the house, is supported on masonry piers and footings. The timber-framed rooms of the first floor living areas are cantilevered out from the rim of the pool. These rooms are braced underneath with exposed timber beams made of Oregon, seated in steel stirrups. The bracing timber beams reach from under the outer walls of the house to the base of the exterior clinker brick ground floor walls. The external grey-stained cedar cladding of the first floor living areas is constructed with secret nails and feature continuous-strip clerestory glazing at the top of the exterior walls. A large steel beam runs along the top of the clerestory windows, supporting the flat roof of Brownbuilt metal sheeting which extends out well past the line of the external walls to provide shade. An innovative technical aspect of the design is the "post tensioning" of the concrete construction of the pool, which was more affordable for a domestic design than the pre-tensioning technique usually used in commercial architecture. The ground floor rooms are constructed in clinker brick and enclose the pool but provide no structural support for the first floor. They form a square of four corridors offering a variety of small rooms which are used for entry/ exit, laundry, storage and pool plant equipment. From this corridor it is possible to enter the under-house area and view the exterior of the pool and the network of brick piers and walls which hold up the weight of the pool and cantilevered living areas. Although Boyd's plans called for the use of Jarrah for the deck of the pool, this couldn't be obtained at the time of construction and Tallowwood was used instead. That timber has since been replaced with Blackbutt when Tallowwood could no longer be obtained.

Interiors

The entrance to the residence is through a modest blue door which leads into one of four ground floor corridors of small rooms forming a square around the pool. The entry hall with stairway includes a porthole which looks into the swimming pool. The porthole with its 19mm thick glass is robust since it has to withstand the pressure of people diving into the pool. Interior walls in the living areas are lined with treated western red cedar. These linings have never been oiled or painted but have been cleaned from time to time with a wire brush which has left the harder lignum intact while wearing down the softwood (similar to a sand-blasted effect). The house initially had cork covered floors but now it is mostly carpeted. There is a replacement (like for like) cork floor in the kitchen. The interior character of the bedroom wing is Japanese in influence, with the use of sliding screen walls to maximise space. There were some initial problems with leaking from the roof and windows resulting in water tracking through the timber walls but these have all been solved. Part of the solution was introducing a translucent cover on the timber battens overhanging the interior courtyard. Boyd chose the materials and finishes including the use of clinker bricks internally and externally. Marion Hall Best's enduring contribution to the interior design of Lyons House is the recommended use of matchstick blinds on view windows, some of which face inwards towards the pool while others face outwards towards the river. Over the years the blinds have all been replaced, like with like (Lyons makes the replacements himself). The curved blind holders are original. Dr Lyons also commissioned lighting design in the living areas by Leslie Walford, whose spot lighting fixtures are attached to ceiling beams in the living areas.

Moveable heritage

Dr Lyons has kept his original correspondence with Boyd. The historian Geoffrey Serle wrote a biography about Robin Boyd and used Lyons' correspondence there. Dr Lyons also has the original drawings for the house by Romberg & Boyd and original drawings for the landscape design by Bruce Mackenzie. Dr Lyons built a good quality model of the proposed design for the house before the house was constructed in 1967 and this model forms part of the moveable heritage of the property.

=== Condition ===
As at 22 April 2014, The exterior and interior of the house is in excellent condition.

=== Modifications and dates ===
Lyons House remains highly intact internally and externally. When considered for listing on the SHR in 2014 the house had been in continuous habitation by the original client and his family for 45 years. Many of the modern materials had required replacement over time and some adjustments were required for the interiors. These works have been done with care and sympathy so as to conserve the original design qualities and intention. An overhanging cantilever roof was added to the south west corner of the house under the supervision of McConnell Smith and Johnson. The house initially had cork covered floors but now it is mostly carpeted. The original carpets were a chocolate brown, but have been replaced by carpet with a lighter colour. There is a replacement cork floor in the kitchen. The cork tile floor of the bathroom has been replaced with tiles. The Klip-Lok roof has been replaced (like for like). Although Boyd's plans called for the use of Jarrah timber for the deck of the pool, this couldn't be obtained at the time of construction and Tallowwood was used instead. That timber has since been replaced with Blackbutt when Tallowwood could no longer be obtained. The mirror wall in the dining room was not part of Boyd's design. Boyd preferred open space but Lyons wanted a TV nook next to the kitchen. A relative suggested using a mirror wall to divide the space and the Lyons have been happy with that solution. Some of the original Mackenzie plantings, which included both native and exotic species, did not do well (e.g. native rosemary, Westringia fruticosa hedges). These have been replanted with replacements which provide a similar effect in terms of scale and appearance. Because of a need for privacy / screening relative to neighbours on the south, earlier shrub plantings on that boundary have been replaced with lily pilly (Syzygium spp./cv.). Repainting the pool is an anxious exercise as the water needs to be drained, and its weight is part of the house's balance. Nonetheless this can be done and has been done several times.

== Heritage listing ==
As at 14 May 2014, Lyons House, built 1967, was of state significance for its aesthetic values as an excellent and intact example of Modern Movement architectural design by the eminent Australian architect, author and critic, Robin Boyd, principal of the Melbourne-based firm Romberg & Boyd. The innovative response to the site's constraints in designing an airborne swimming pool as the structural centre of the house, the cantilevered living areas arranged around the pool and sufficiently elevated to access fine water views, the use of traditional materials such as timber and clinker brick, internally and externally in combination with industrial materials such as post-tensioned concrete, the use of Japanese-inspired internal partitions, the visual expression of structural elements and the valorisation of the natural landscape setting are all important components of the design. The significance of the house is further heightened by the design contributions of Marion Hall Best (interiors) and Bruce Mackenzie (landscaping). The house is the only known intact example of Boyd's architectural design work in NSW. It has featured internationally in architectural journals and books about the life and work of Boyd.

Lyons House was listed on the New South Wales State Heritage Register on 19 December 2014 having satisfied the following criteria.

The place is important in demonstrating aesthetic characteristics and/or a high degree of creative or technical achievement in New South Wales.

Lyons House, built 1967, is of state aesthetic significance as an excellent and intact example of Modern Movement architectural design by the eminent Australian architect, author and critic, Robin Boyd, who was principal of the Melbourne-based architectural firm Romberg & Boyd. The work included an innovative response to the site's constraints through the design of an airborne swimming pool as the structural centre of the house with cantilevered living areas arranged around it sufficiently elevated to access fine water views on three sides., The design included the use of traditional materials such as timber and clinker brick, internally and externally in combination with industrial materials such as post-tensioned concrete, and also the use of Japanese-inspired internal partitions. . . The visual expression of structural elements and the valorisation of the natural landscape setting are all important components of the design, which is a model of structural economy and site responsiveness. The significance of the place is further heightened by the design contributions of Marion Hall Best (interiors) and Bruce Mackenzie (landscaping). The only known intact example of Boyd's design work in NSW, the house has a distinctive architectural form and high quality detailing, both internally and externally, that results in a remarkable relationship between the house and its delightful landscape setting overlooking the Port Hacking River and Royal National Park. It has featured internationally in architectural journals and books about the life and work of Boyd.

The place has a strong or special association with a particular community or cultural group in New South Wales for social, cultural or spiritual reasons.

Lyons House is of state significance to architects and others who appreciate modern design (including architects). It has been listed on the community based heritage registers of DOCOMO Australia, the NSW Institute of Architects and the NSW National Trust. Lyons House was mentioned in every meeting in a series of consultations with NSW experts on Modern Movement design held by the Heritage Division in 2011.

The place possesses uncommon, rare or endangered aspects of the cultural or natural history of New South Wales.

Lyons House is of state significance as the only known intact example in NSW of the design work of renowned Melbourne architect Robin Boyd (since Boyd's Black Dolphin Hotel in Merimbula has been severely altered). Lyons House exhibits unusual construction and detailing. It is also the only Modern Movement place in NSW known to also incorporate the work of leading interior designer Marion Hall Best and leading landscape architect Bruce Mackenzie.

The place is important in demonstrating the principal characteristics of a class of cultural or natural places/environments in New South Wales.

Lyons House is of state significance as a highly regarded and intact, representative example of the mid twentieth century Modern Movement approach to architectural design in eastern Australia. Representative aspects of this approach includes Lyons House's emphasis on the form of the house responding innovatively to the client's requirements rather than following a traditional template for a home, its geometric, cubist shape, open planning and use of asymmetry, carefully detailed surfaces and sun-shading devices rather than ornament, its combination of industrial techniques (post tensioned concrete) with traditional materials (timber and clinker brick), its focus on the view out rather than the view in and the close attention paid to the relationship of the building to its landscape context.

== See also ==
- Architecture of Sydney
- Australian residential architectural styles
