= Dolans Bay, New South Wales =

Dolans Bay
- Suburb
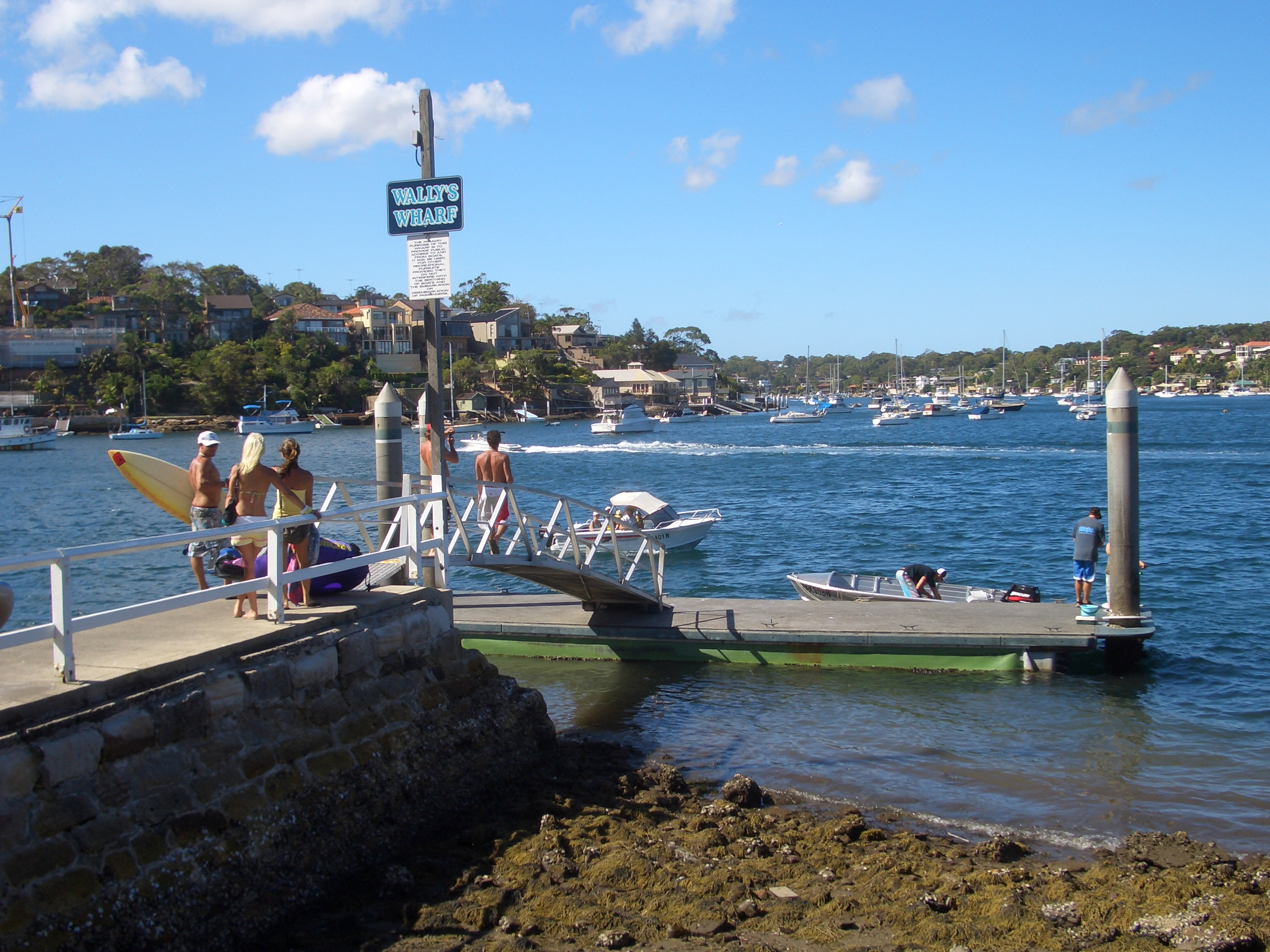
- Wally's Wharf

- Interactive map of Dolans Bay
- Country: Australia
- State: New South Wales
- City: Sydney
- LGA: Sutherland Shire
- Location: 26 km (16 mi) south of Sydney CBD

Government
  - State electorate: Cronulla
  - Federal division: Cook
- Elevation: 29 m (95 ft)

Population
  - Total: 699 (2021 census)
- Postcode: 2229
Suburbs around Dolans Bay
Caringbah	Caringbah South	Woolooware
Lilli Pilli	Dolans Bay	Burraneer
Port Hacking	Maianbar	Bundeena

Dolans Bay is a bayside suburb in Southern Sydney, in the state of New South Wales, Australia, that is located 26 kilometres (16 mi) south of the Sydney central business district, in the local government area of the Sutherland Shire.

Dolans Bay is on the north shore of the Port Hacking estuary. The suburb is named after the small cove on the edge of Burraneer Bay. Houses overlook the bay and some line the water's edge together with boatsheds. Boats are moored in the bay, which provides protection from the southerly wind. Burraneer Bay features a private marina and slipway with full repair facilities.

The suburb of Dolans Bay is surrounded by the suburbs of Caringbah South, Lilli Pilli and Port Hacking. The suburb of Burraneer is located across Burraneer Bay. The villages of Maianbar and Bundeena are located on the opposite bank of Port Hacking.

== History ==
Dolans Bay was named after a land owner in the area, Patrick Dolan and/or his son, Dominick Dolan. Patrick purchased approximately 286 acres adjoining the bay in 1856. In 1858 Mary and Andrew Webster paid 108 pounds and 15 shillings plus a yearly peppercorn quit rent for their land in this area. The Websters sold their land to Dominick Dolan in 1863.

In 1927, 30 allotments of "Port Hacking Seymour Estate' were advertised to be auctioned on 9 April by C. Monro Ltd. auctioneers. A stone bungalow was also advertised for sale on one of the blocks.

== Heritage listings ==
Dolans Bay has a number of heritage-listed sites, including: 733 Port Hacking Road, known as Lyons House, Sydney.

== Population ==
In the 2021 Census, there were 699 people in Dolans Bay. 86.1% of people were born in Australia and 89.0% of people spoke only English at home. The most common responses for religion were Catholic 31.6%, No Religion 29.9% and Anglican 16.5%.

== Transport ==
The suburb can be accessed by Port Hacking Road or Saunders Bay Road, both of which lead to Lilli Pilli Point and Wally's Wharf. U-Go Mobility operates bus route 978 to Caringbah and Westfield Miranda.

== Notable people ==
- Scott Morrison – Former Australian Prime Minister, a current resident

== Gallery ==
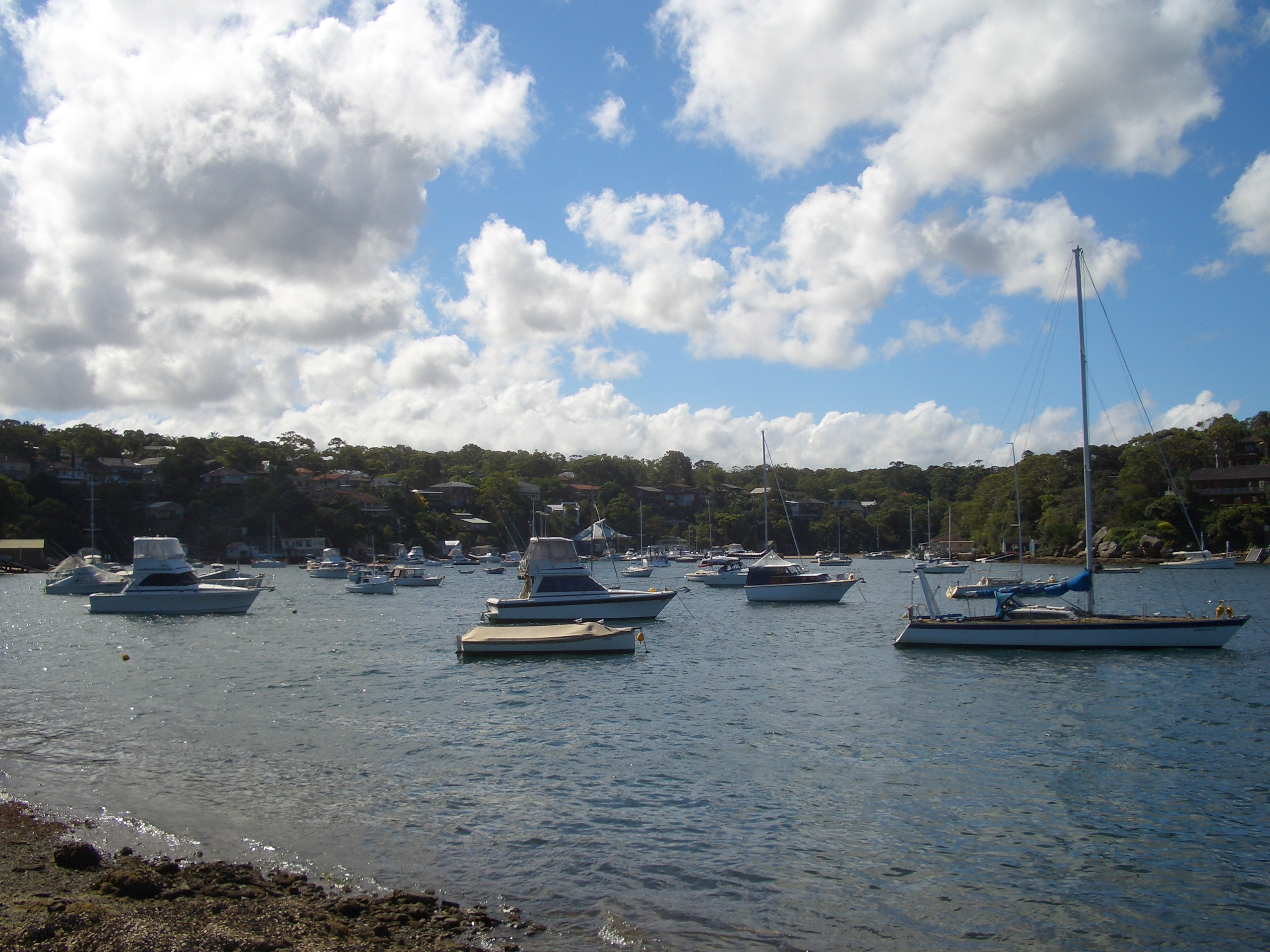
Dolans Bay, pictured in 2007

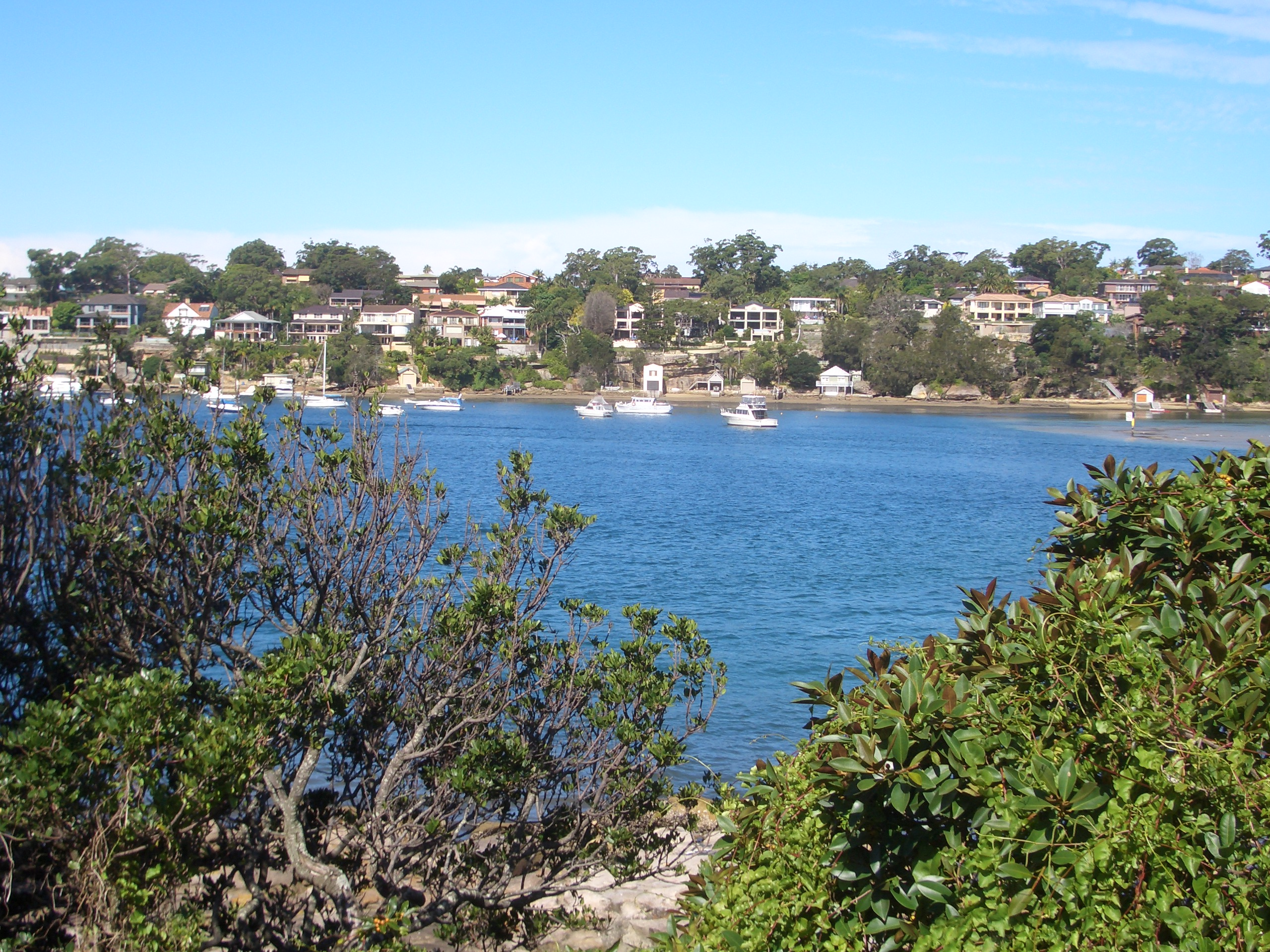
Dolans Bay, view to Burraneer

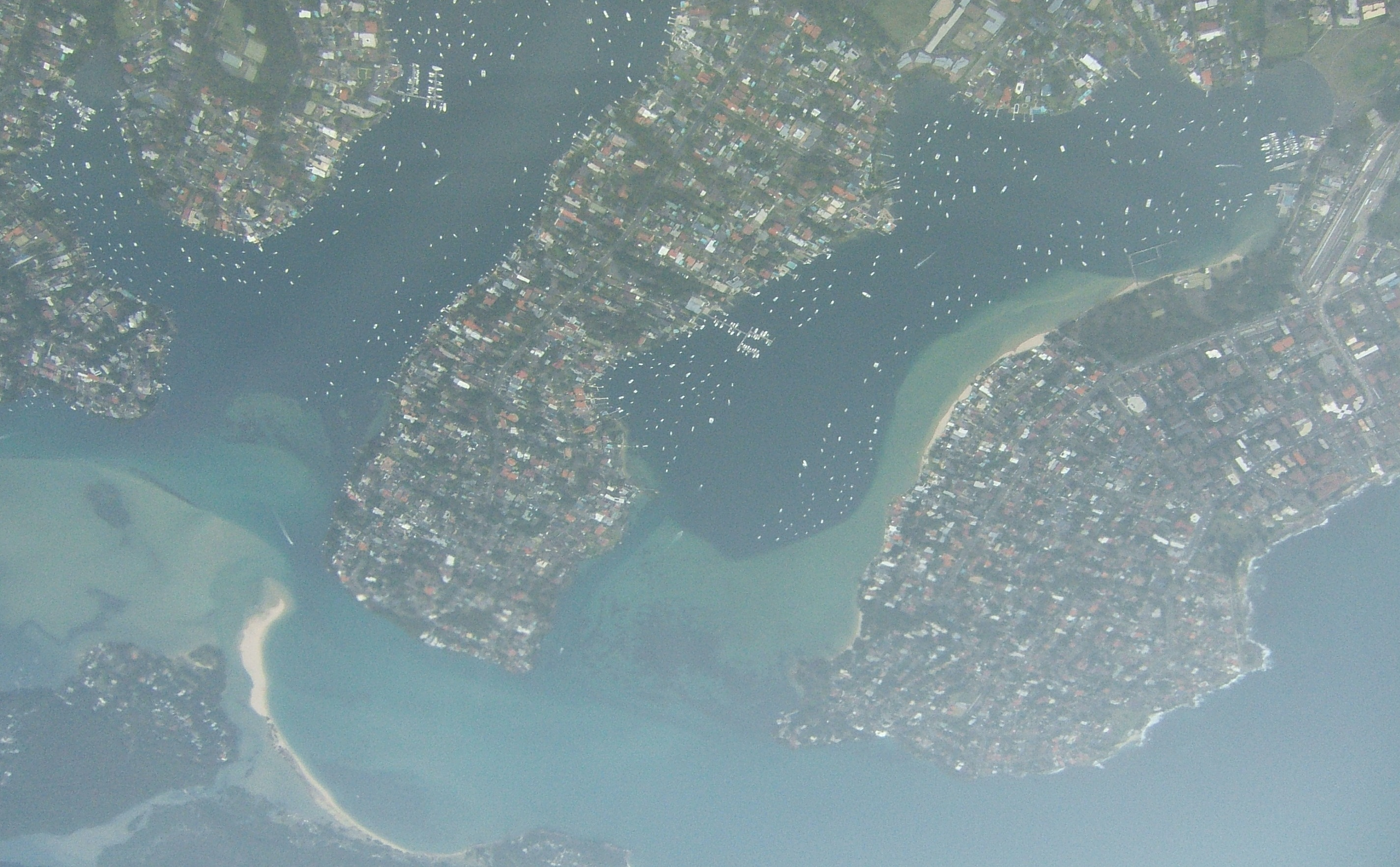
Aerial view of Port Hacking, Dolans Bay, Burraneer and Cronulla
