= Kelvin, Bringelly =

Kelvin
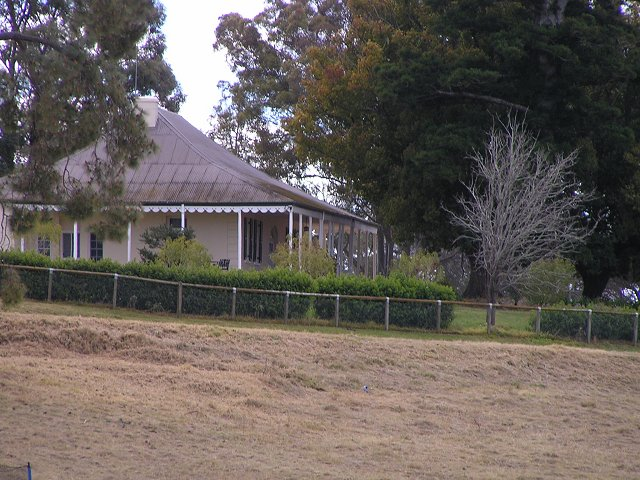

- Location within Sydney Location within Australia
- 33.9200°S 150.7385°E
- Location: 30 The Retreat, Bringelly, City of Liverpool, Sydney New South Wales, Australia

History
- Built: 1820–1826

Site notes
- Owner: FORM architects (aust) pty ltd

New South Wales Heritage Register
- Official name: Kelvin; Kelvin Park Group; The Retreat; Thomas Laycock's Cottage Vale; Cottage-ville
- Type: state heritage (landscape)
- Designated: 2 April 1999
- Reference no.: 46
- Type: Homestead Complex
- Category: Farming and Grazing
- Builders: Thomas Laycock

Kelvin is a heritage-listed residence at 30 The Retreat, Bringelly, City of Liverpool, Sydney, New South Wales, Australia. It was built from 1820 to 1826 by Thomas Laycock. It is also known as Retreat Farm, The Retreat, Thomas Laycock's Cottage Vale and Cottage-ville. It was added to the New South Wales State Heritage Register on 2 April 1999.

== History ==
Traditional owners of this country were the Cabrogal (Cahbrogal) clan (land around Liverpool), the Murigong (Muringong) clan (land at the Cowpastures), the Warmuli (land around Prospect) and the Gomerigal people (land around South Creek). Bringelly is an Aboriginal name, one of only two in the Liverpool district.

Kelvin Park estate's history is bound up with several grants of land including those of 600 acres to Thomas Laycock Jr. (soldier, explorer, businessman, farmer), Penelope Lucas (governess to John Macarthur and Elizabeth Macarthur and family, Parramatta), William Hutchinson, Edmund Wright, and Charles Reid.

In 1824, Laycock's 1200-acre "Retreat Farm" was sold to Edward Riley, and resold within a month to Provost Marshal John Thomas Campbell (Governor Macquarie's secretary prior to 1819), who tried again to sell it. Liston (2010) notes that Laycock Junior's South Creek estate was known as "Cottage Vale", later called "The Retreat", and "Kelvin". She adds that Campbell was a successful farmer and pastoralist, breeding cattle and horses and in 1826 was a member of the NSW Land Board, responsible for assessing the resources of prospective settlers who applied for land grants. Campbell died in 1830.

A lease was given to the board of directors of the newly formed Australian Agricultural Company in early 1825 to accommodate its newly appointed director, Robert Dawson and the large party of workers and flock of merino sheep who'd accompanied him to the colony. (Campbell was a shareholder in the AA Company). The company was formed in 1824 to "extend and improve the flocks of merino sheep" in NSW.

In 1824, London was in the midst of an enormous stock market boom. With Australian wool becoming increasingly important, two companies – the Australian Agricultural Company (AACo.) and the Van Diemen's Land Company – were floated on the London Stock Exchange to promote raising fine-wooled sheep in the Australian colonies. The AACo. became a major force in the Australian coal and pastoral industries and in the settlement and development of the Hunter River and Port Stephens regions. Today, listed on the Australian Stock Exchange, it is the oldest Australian company operating under its original name.

Founded by a special Act of Parliament and under Royal Charter, it acquired the right to hold and sell land in New South Wales. Its founding members were a group of British bankers, merchants and politicians who saw the potential for big profits to be made in the colony.

The terms of the charter were that most of the labour would be provided by convicts under the supervision of superintendents, overseers and skilled mechanics sent from England. If, at the end of 15 years, the company had expended 10,000 pounds on improvements and employed 1400 convicts, it would obtain freehold title to its land. The size of the land grant was not specified in the charter, but discussions between the company directors and the Colonial Office settled on one million acres.

The company appointed a chief agent, Robert Dawson and a Colonial Committee to assist him. This eventually included just three people – James Macarthur (fourth son of John Macarthur), his cousin Hannibal Macarthur and his brother-in-law, Principal Surgeon, James Bowman. The committee took a four-year lease of "The Retreat" (later 'Kelvin') at Bringelly near Camden for the immediate accommodation of imported stock, and sought advice on the best location for the land grant.

In June 1825 Dawson sailed from the Isle of Wight with 27 employees and their wives and families, 800 French and Anglo merino sheep, 8 cattle and 6 horses. They were followed a few weeks later by an overseer, 6 shepherds and a further 79 French merinos.

In January 1826, when people and stock were settled, Dawson sailed to Newcastle with a small party on the "Liverpool Packet" and from there, they travelled across country to inspect Port Stephens, an area which, of all those suggested, had the great advantage of access by water.

Temporary huts were added to the house on the farm to accommodate the worker families. Within two months he moved most of the party to Carrington, near Port Stephens, but the company continued to use the Retreat Farm for stock agistment. Imported thoroughbred and Cleveland stallions were stood at stud at Retreat Farm in 1826. Sheep were sent to it in 1827 with German shepherds. The farm continued to be leased to the AA Company from 1826-c. 1828-30.

In 1831 Campbell's brother Reverend C. Campbell, heir to the estate on John Campbell's death, let the farm for a year, and in 1832 approved its auction. In 1833 Alfred Kennerley (landholder, philanthropist, later Premier of Tasmania) bought it, using it as a base for stock agistment and operating his other properties at Parramatta and Mudgee. He returned to England in 1842 and in 1845 sold his stock and leased his land holdings.

He returned and is thought to have actively farmed "Retreat Farm". In 1853 he sold the farm to David Bell. In 1857 and again in 1862 it was mortgaged to Rowland Hassall. Bell was insolvent in 1864 and 1325 acres (including part of Lucas' grant to the north) were sold to Frederick Borton. About this time a store and dwelling known as the Bringelly Post Office and a public pound and blacksmith's shop had been built on the extreme (southwestern) boundary of the estate, and the junction of Bringelly, Penrith, Camden and Greendale Roads. In 1869 William Pearce of Seven Hills bought the farm, and 1872 records show he lived there, as well as farmer Frank Horsey.

In 1896 land on "The Retreat"s southern boundary was resumed to build Bringelly Road, and at its southwest corner for the Northern Road and a school, which was operating in 1897. Bringelly village grew up around the school and post office. The Retreat, post resumption, was c. 1187 acres (480ha). In 1901 the property title was transferred to Pearce's wife Elizabeth Charlotte, and it was subsequently sold. The Pearce family owned The Retreat more than 30 years, the longest period of tenure in its history to that date.

In May 1901 George Albert Church, grazier of Campbelltown bought The Retreat, and, heavily mortgaged, it was sold in 1911 to Arthur Owen Ryder, gentleman of North Sydney, who sold it within months to Charles Tyson of Aberdeen, grazier, who renamed it "Kelvin". The farm may have been attractive due to its proximity to abattoirs, four of which were in Liverpool in 1912, and for agistment of cattle prior to sale or slaughter.

In March 1914 Philip Staughton, grazier of Dalappol, Narrandera bought Kelvin. In October added to the land by buying lots 12–17 of Section 4, part of the subdivision of Hutchinson's former grant. This gave Kelvin access to Clyde Road to the east, later known as Badgery's Creek Road.

In 1918 Hugh Peter MacDonald, grazier of Yandra, Nimmitabel, bought Kelvin, transferring title to Lorna Jessie MacDonald, spinster, in 1921. Later records indicate that sheep were grazed on the property.

From 19 March 1942 to 28 February 1945, 370 acres of the 1320-acre property was leased by Lorna MacDonald to the Commonwealth Government, converted for use as a "Dispersal Aerodrome", for National Security Regulations by the RAAF. During this time it was owner-operated as a holding area for sheep marketing, wool growing and fattening, having a well improved grazing area with all necessary buildings. The Commonwealth's interest in Kelvin was influenced by a flat area along South Creek suitable as an airstrip. Similar defence positions at Penrith were a response to war in the Pacific and Australia's preparations for conflict.

The Dispersal area was never used and in 1944 the owner was able to resume use of part of the land for grazing, however lease of the airstrip and buildings was maintained. When it was deemed that the site was no longer of use to the war effort negotiations began to remove redundant items. Gravel surfaces, hideouts and many other items were left in situ. A few pieces of equipment were salvaged and disposed of. Compensation was made for fence repairs and estimates made for work to restore the buildings.

In 1954 the National Trust of Australia (NSW) led by Ward & Olive Havard visited Kelvin. Between 1950 and September 1960 portions of Kelvin were transferred to the Commonwealth of Australia and the Overseas Telecommunications Commission. A strip of land (part of Lot 12) was retained, maintaining access between the residue of Kelvin and Badgery's Creek Road to the west. Traditional farm access had been from the east across Thompson's Creek, slightly north of the homestead. By 1960 Kelvin was approximately 970 acres.

When bought by the Medich family in 1982, Kelvin was of the order of 250 acres.

Kelvin was again subdivided in 1985, creating a new road (Kelvin Park Drive) connecting the homestead complex and Lot 26, between Thompson's Creek and South Creek, to Bringelly Road (to the south). 25 smaller building allotments facing Bringelly Road were also formed (Lots 1-25).

In 1990 Kelvin Park was further subdivided into 6 allotments, isolating the homestead and farm buildings on a substantially smaller allotment of less than 10 hectares, accessed by The Retreat Road. Lot 26 east of Thompson's Creek was also subdivided into residential allotments.

Kelvin is associated with the historic property "Collingwood" in Liverpool and also that of "Fernleigh" in Sutherland, through owner Thomas Laycock Junior's estates. Fernleigh was built c. 1821 for Laycock junior, who, while himself mostly resident at "Kelvin", built Fernleigh for his second wife Margaret Connell and the six children of his first marriage to Isabella Bunker of "Collingwood", Liverpool.

== Description ==
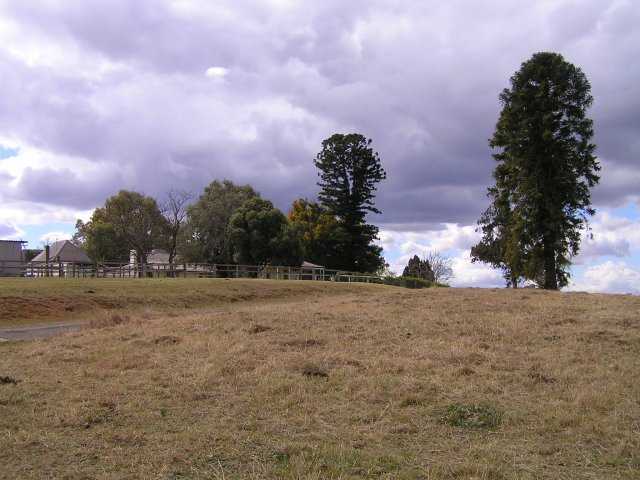
Landscape

Kelvin Park Group consists of:

- the homestead, an early Colonial Georgian, single storey, stuccoed brick bungalow with hipped, iron roof;
- the kitchen (possible the former homestead), a detached, single storey Early Colonial Georgian style bungalow to the west of the main homestead;
- the Servants' or Maids' quarters, and dairy;
- the Coach House, a one and a half storey sandstock brick Early Victorian style building with a loft, also used as a stables and a lock up;
- two slab timber sheds;
- landscape features, including gardens, trees, driveways and fences;
- late 20th century farm buildings and structures, stabling, sheds and yards;
- various relics and other works including a cellar, cistern, early tank and tank stand and horse sweep;
- the site's potential archaeological resources

The property was reported to be in good condition with high archaeological potential as at 17 March 2006.

=== Homestead ===
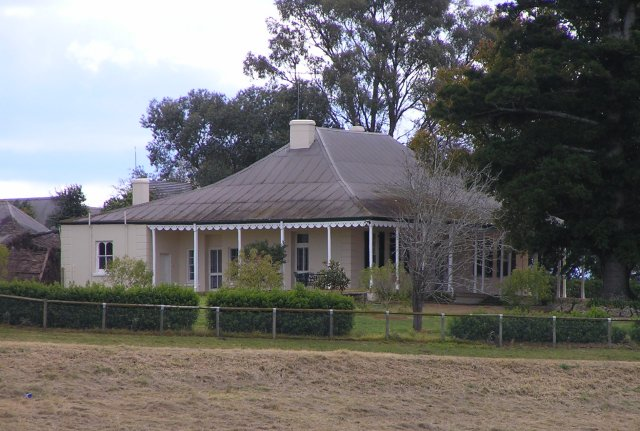
Homestead

Kelvin is a stuccoed single storey Georgian farmhouse. Hipped iron roof, cranked in vernacular fashion over wide high verandah on three sides. This is paved with sandstone. The roof supported on heavily chamfered timber posts and with an exceptionally finely scalloped timber valance board. Shuttered windows. Front door has beautiful elliptical fanlight over it. Exceptional cedar joinery inside. At rear is sandstock brick kitchen, dairy, offices, small carriage house at rear.

=== Grounds and gardens ===
The main building group of Kelvin Park is sited on a low hill with a good outlook to the west of and above Thompsons Creek, and is set in a well maintained but largely modern garden with a number of important early trees. A circular driveway in front of the house around the base of a large fig (Ficus sp.) tree is a remnant of the original/early carriage loop but appears to be no longer used for vehicular traffic. At the entrance to the homestead are remnants of an old/earlier garden and over the water tank stand is an old climbing rose. The major early trees around the house and outbuildings group include a hoop pine (Araucaria cunninghamii), 3 camphor laurels (Cinnamomum camphora) (2 flanking the front door), and the fig (Ficus sp.) that forms a centre-piece in the driveway loop.

Many of the original early plantings have been removed over time and there has been a major garden refurbishment since the 1970s. A modern swimming pool has been installed in the front garden.

The remnants of the early layout include part of an ironstone gravel drive, fine lawns, the gravelled forecourt to the stables behind (west) of the house and large old trees. The trees of most heritage value are considered to be the two pines which include hoop pines (Araucaria cunninghamii), brown pine (Podocarpus elatus), Canary Island pine (Pinus canariensis), and Monterey pines (Pinus radiata). Two large camphor laurels (Cinnamomum camphora) flank the view from the front door, in the carriage loop.

Other notable elements of the garden include cypress, old olive trees (Olea sp.), Cape plumbago bushes (Plumbago capensis), a large lemon-scented gum (Corymbia citriodora), the fine hedge (Campsis sp.) between house and stable forecourt, and the creeping fig (Ficus pumila) covering the walls of the stables.

The main homestead garden is enclosed with a timber and wire mesh fence. A wide and relatively old timber gate gives access to this enclosed area from the north. The present vehicular approach to the site terminates in the rear service courtyard and the entrance to this is marked by a pair of (early) half-round topped timber post with more modern timber rail fencing.

A remnant core of a farm complex including homestead, outbuildings, garden including plantings and paddocks. Its current entry drive orientation (from the south, south-west and south-east) dates from a c. 1990 subdivision which created a new road in from the south-east, called The Retreat. The original estate access up until then was from the east over Thompson's Creek, approaching the house from the north-east then north.

=== Modifications and dates ===
- 1818: 1200 acres (486 hectares) Laycock, and from 1824 Campbell)
- 1825 AA company extends the house and builds housing for their workers and families with convict labour
- 1833+ Kennerley adds numerous outbuildings
- c. 1896 part of the land resumed for development of urban infrastructure including roads, school s,and post office snecessary for establishing the village of Bringelly (in Kelvin's south-west corner)
- 1896 land in southern boundary of farm resumed by Minister forthe Public Works to build Bringelly Road, and at farm's south-west corner for the Northern Road and a school (which was operating by 1897). Residue of the farm was over 1187 acres (480ha).
- 1911 C ha). es Tyson renamed the farm "Kelvin."
- c. 1942-5 Commonwealth Government leased the farm for use as a "Dispersal Aerodrome" for the RAAF; stock was removed and areas fenced off. Alterations to buildings were made to accommodate RAAF requirements during the war. Substantial amounts of timber on the property were felled (some to clear flight approaches to the airstrip), some used for construction purposes. When deemed no longer necessary, negotiations ensued to remove redundant items. Gravel surfaces, hiedouts andemany, other items were left in situ. A few pieces of equipment were salvaged or disposed of.
- 1950-60 portions (to the west and north of the homestead group) were transferred to the Commonwealth and Overseas Telecommunications Commission. A strip of land was retained, maintaining access between Kelvin Park and Badgery's Creek Road to the west. Property reduced to approximately 970 acres.
- 19 72 Medich family bought the property, by then about 250 acres.
- 1985 Kelvin (360 hectares) was subdivided into 2-hectare (5-acre) lots, creating a new road (Kelvin Park Drive) connecting the homestead complex, between Thompson's Creek and South Creek, to Bringelly Road in the south. 25 smaller building allotments facing Bringelly Road were also formed.
- In 1990 Kelvin Park was further subdivided into six allotments, isolating the homestead group on a substantially smaller allotment of less than 10 hectares, accessed by the (new) Retreat Road. Lot 26 to the east of Thompson's Creek was also subdivided into residential allotments.

Its current entry drive orientation (from the south, southwest, and southeast) dates from a c. 1990 subdivision that created a new road in from the southeast, called The Retreat. The original estate access up until then was from the east over Thompson's Creek, approaching the house from the north-east then north.

During field inspections for the Heritage Study Review undertaken in 2004, it was noted that the gardens and setting in the immediate environs of the group have undergone some changes since 1992. Photographic records indicate that some vegetation to the rear of the house has been removed. According to the present landowner, general garden maintenance was conducted at the site over the last few years. In addition, the wider setting of the site is being encroached upon by residential development. Nonetheless, some of earlier mature trees remain, including the fig that forms a centre-piece in the driveway loop. The fencing and various entrance gates described in 1992 are still intact.

== Heritage listing ==
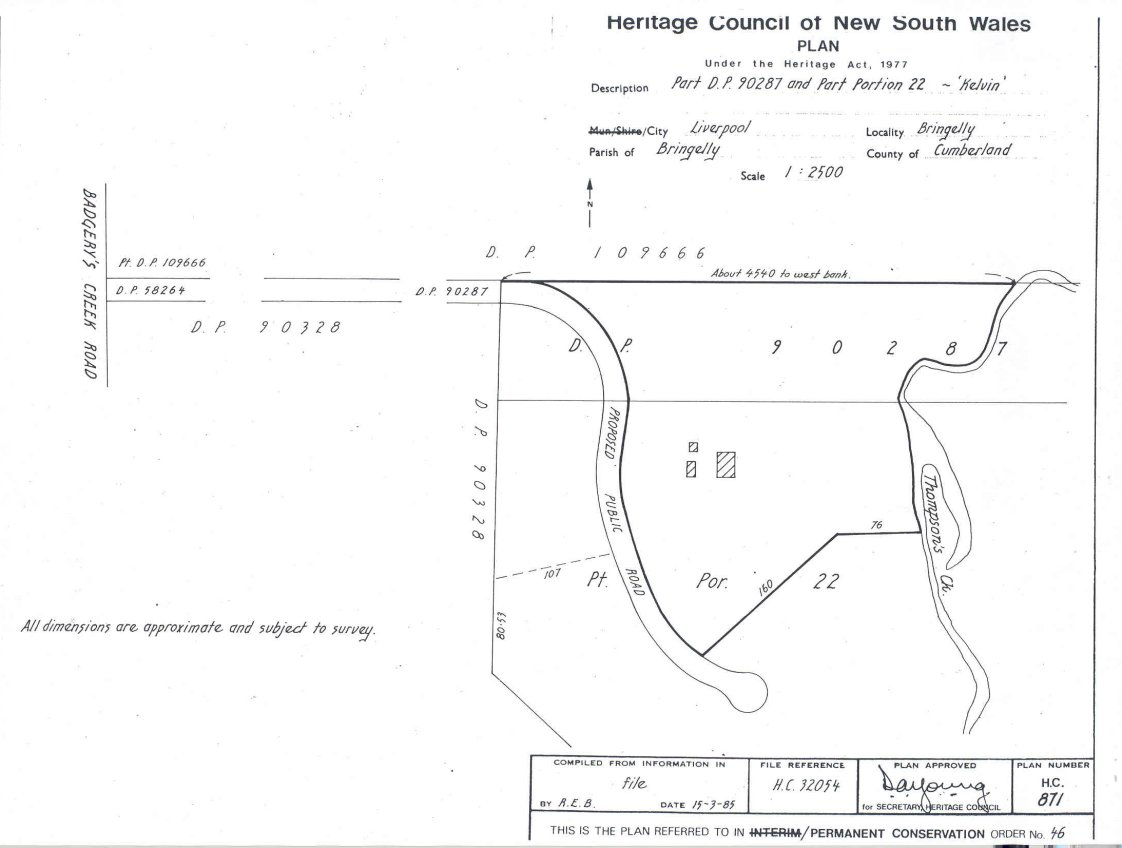
Heritage boundaries

Kelvin Park, formerly known as Cottageville or Retreat Farm, is able to demonstrate the pastoral development of Bringelly from 1818. Although there is only a remnant (9.784 ha) of the original 1200-acre site (486 ha), the homestead and farm buildings in their current setting with extensive views over rural land are still able to demonstrate the principles of 19th-century farm estate architecture, planning and design.

Kelvin Park is significant for its association with a number of people and organisations of importance in NSW's cultural history, including Thomas Laycock Junior, who established the farm at Bringelly, and later owners, John Thomas Campbell and Alfred Kennerley. The lease of the property by the Australian Agricultural Company, the country's oldest agricultural and pastoral development company, established in 1824, is of particular significance.

The homestead at Kelvin Park retains its colonial Georgian single-storey form and planning and is representative of a gentleman's rural residence of the 1820s. Despite some modifications it retains the architectural elements and character that make it a good example of its type. The kitchen wing and servants' quarters are modest examples of early colonial Georgian style architecture but similarly retain their original form and planning. All of these buildings are evidence of the establishment of a home and farm by Thomas Laycock.

The brick coach house at Kelvin Park retains its picturesque, early Victorian form, planning, and much of its original detailing. It is evidence of the development of the property in the 1850s by Alfred Kennerley, who later became Premier of Tasmania.

The two slab barns are evidence of Kelvin Park as a working farm from 1818 until, at least, the mid-20th century. The structures demonstrate 19th-century building methods and farm practice.

The buildings at Kelvin Park belong to an important and rare group of colonial Georgian and early Victorian farm buildings that contribute to the historic rural landscape. They are evidence of continuity of land use for farming for 187 years (to 2005).

The form of, and elements within, the garden, courtyard areas, and entry to the property are evidence of the planning of the homestead complex by Laycock and subsequent owners and express the status they hoped to convey.

The homestead of Kelvin Park retains important historic views to the east to Thompson's Creek and beyond to South Creek. The site also retains views of other historically related rural landscapes beyond the current boundaries, such as the pasture and stands of trees to the north. Both views contribute to the site's significance and maintain the context of the homestead group.

Kelvin Park group, including the homestead complex and remnant of farmland, is significant at local, regional, state, and national levels. All areas of the site are considered equally significant.

The Kelvin Park site landscaping is a significant component of the Kelvin Park group. The early numerous tree plantings contribute to making the site a notable landmark in the area. The remaining details of driveways, fencing, and entrances also contribute to the historic and social evidence provided by the site of its original patterns of occupation and use. The site is part of an intact early 19th century farm complex that is now rare within the wider urbanized environs of Liverpool. There is the potential to gain more information on the site from further archaeological and documentary research. (LEP listing/landscape).

The setting of the house on a knoll above a creek, its remnant layout of early buildings and garden, and its fine, mature trees, particularly its variety of old pines, add greatly to the character and significance of the property. The garden and setting are considered to have regional significance

Built by Thomas Laycock junior in 1820, having received the Bringelly grant in 1818. He returned to Australia in 1817 after fighting for England in the American War of 1812. An early house of historical associations, being one of the notable country houses of the 1820s. It is well sited above Thompson's Creek and is surrounded by a landscaped garden.

Kelvin was listed on the New South Wales State Heritage Register on 2 April 1999.
