= Burraneer Bay =

Bight in Australia

- Location of Burraneer Bay in New South Wales
- Location: Southern Sydney, New South Wales
- Coordinates: 34°03′55″S 151°08′05″E
- Type: Bay
- Primary outflows: Hacking River/Port Hacking
- Basin countries: Australia
- Managing agency: Sutherland Shire Council
- Frozen: never
- Settlements: Burraneer, Caringbah South, Dolans Bay, Port Hacking

The Burraneer Bay is a bay on the lower estuarine Hacking River of Port Hacking in southern Sydney, in the state of New South Wales, Australia.

== Location and features ==
With a catchment that drains many of the most southern suburbs of the Sutherland Shire, Burraneer Bay is located near where the Hacking River and Port Hacking estuary meet Gunnamatta Bay and empty into Bate Bay. The bay's catchment area is bound by Port Hacking to the south, Gunnamatta Bay sub-catchment to the east, Dolans Bay sub-catchment to the west and the Woolooware Bay sub-catchment to the north. The bay is surrounded by the suburbs of Burraneer to the north and east, Caringbah South to the northwest and west, and Dolans Bay and Port Hacking to the southwest, at the bay's junction with the estuary. A marina is located on the north western side of Burraneer Bay.

Notable residents that have lived in the area surrounding Burraneer Bay include cricket players Ricky Ponting and Glenn McGrath.

Burraneer is an Aboriginal word meaning "point of the bay". The bay was named by surveyor Robert Dixon in 1827, who chose many Aboriginal names for many of the bays in the area.

== Gallery ==
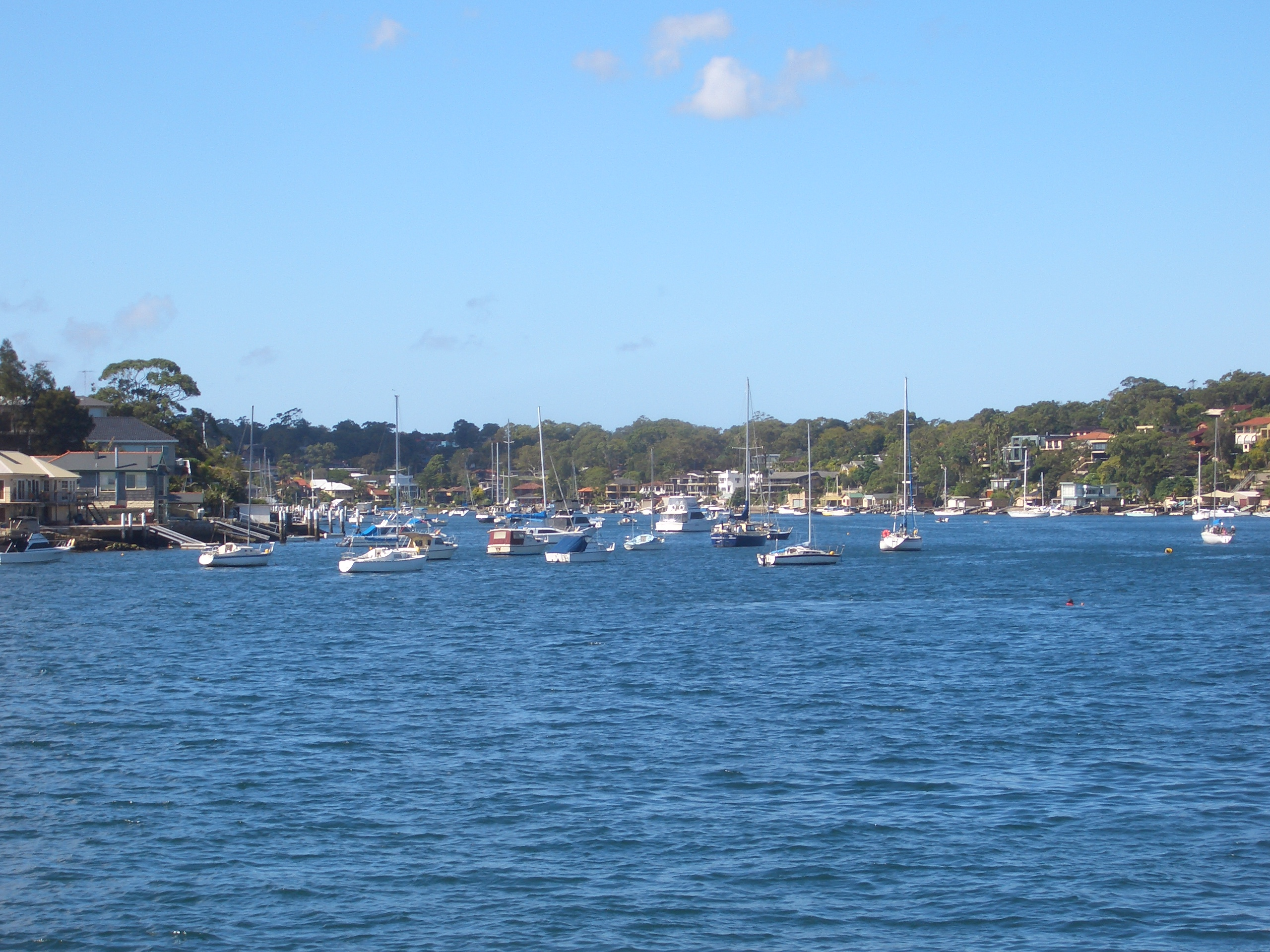
A view of Burraneer Bay

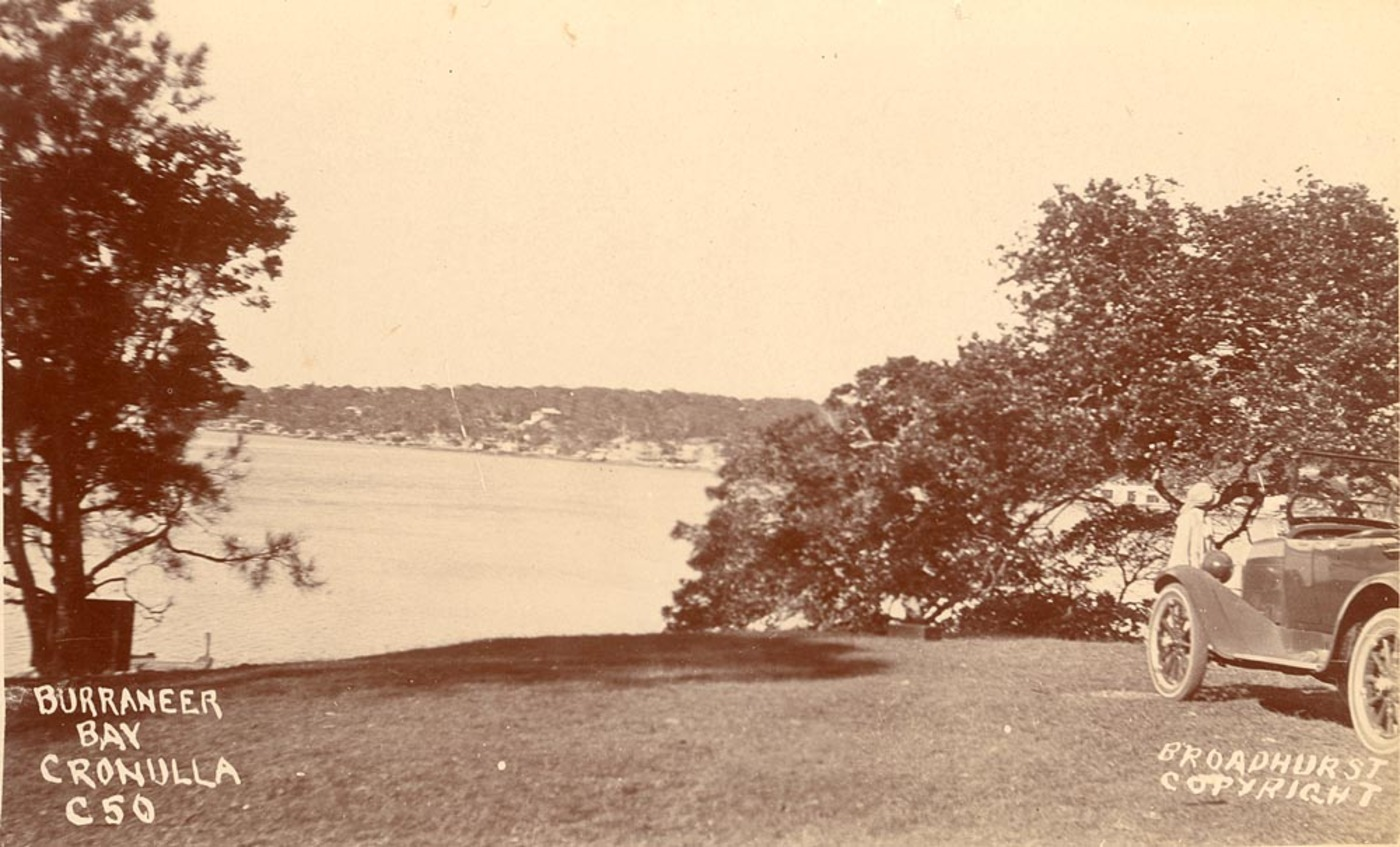
Burraneer Bay, Cronulla
