= Lilli Pilli, New South Wales =

Lilli Pilli
- Suburb
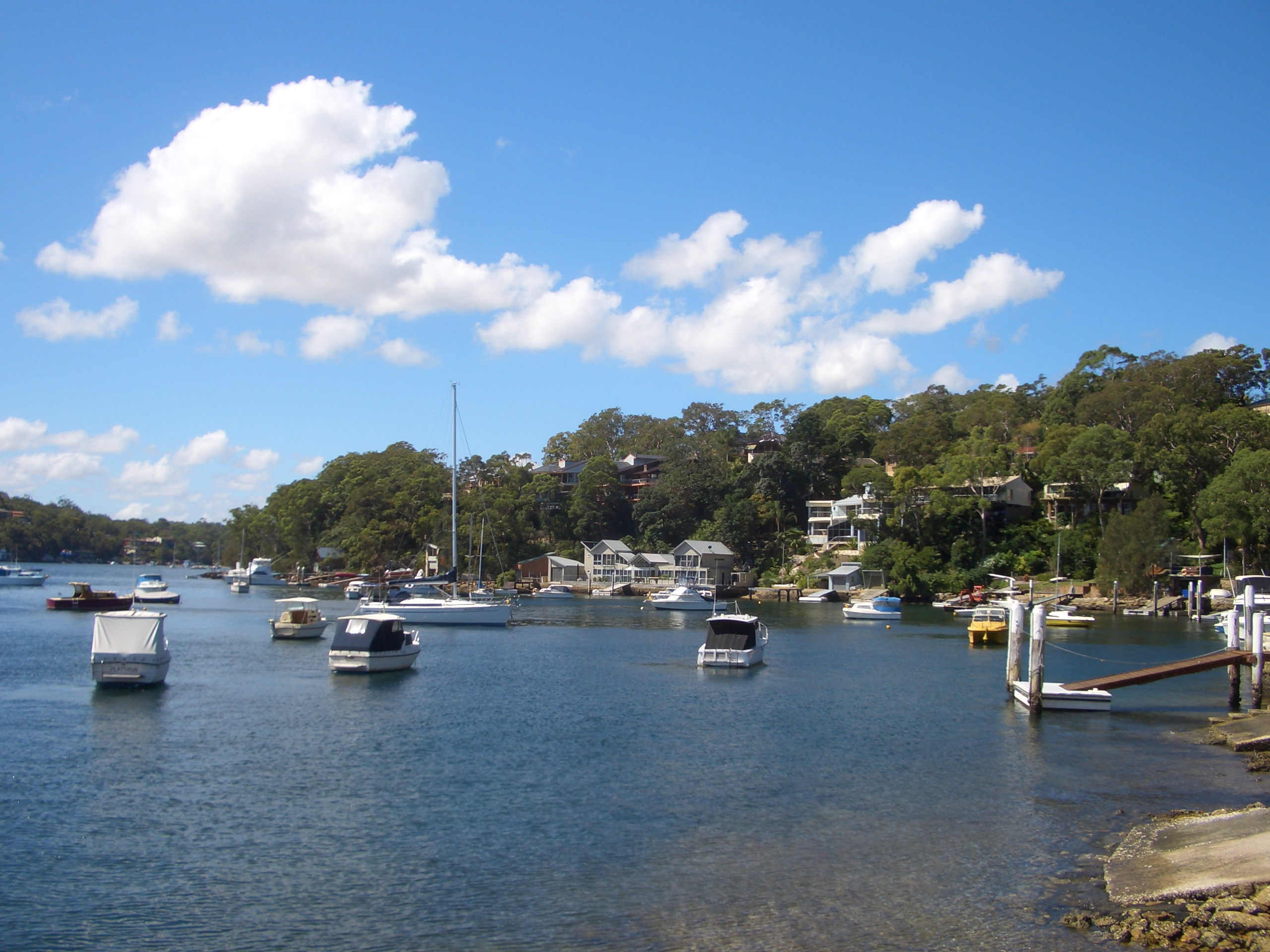
- Lilli Pilli Point

- Interactive map of Lilli Pilli
- Coordinates: 34°04′06″S 151°06′57″E
- Country: Australia
- State: New South Wales
- City: Sydney
- LGA: Sutherland Shire
- Location: 26 km (16 mi) south of Sydney CBD

Government
  - State electorate: Cronulla
  - Federal division: Cook

Area
  - Total: 0.9 km^{2} (0.35 sq mi)
- Elevation: 35 m (115 ft)

Population
  - Total: 1,405 (2021 census)
  - Density: 1,560/km^{2} (4,040/sq mi)
- Postcode: 2229
Suburbs around Lilli Pilli
Yowie Bay	Caringbah	Dolans Bay
Caringbah South	Lilli Pilli	Port Hacking
Warumbul	Royal National Park	Maianbar

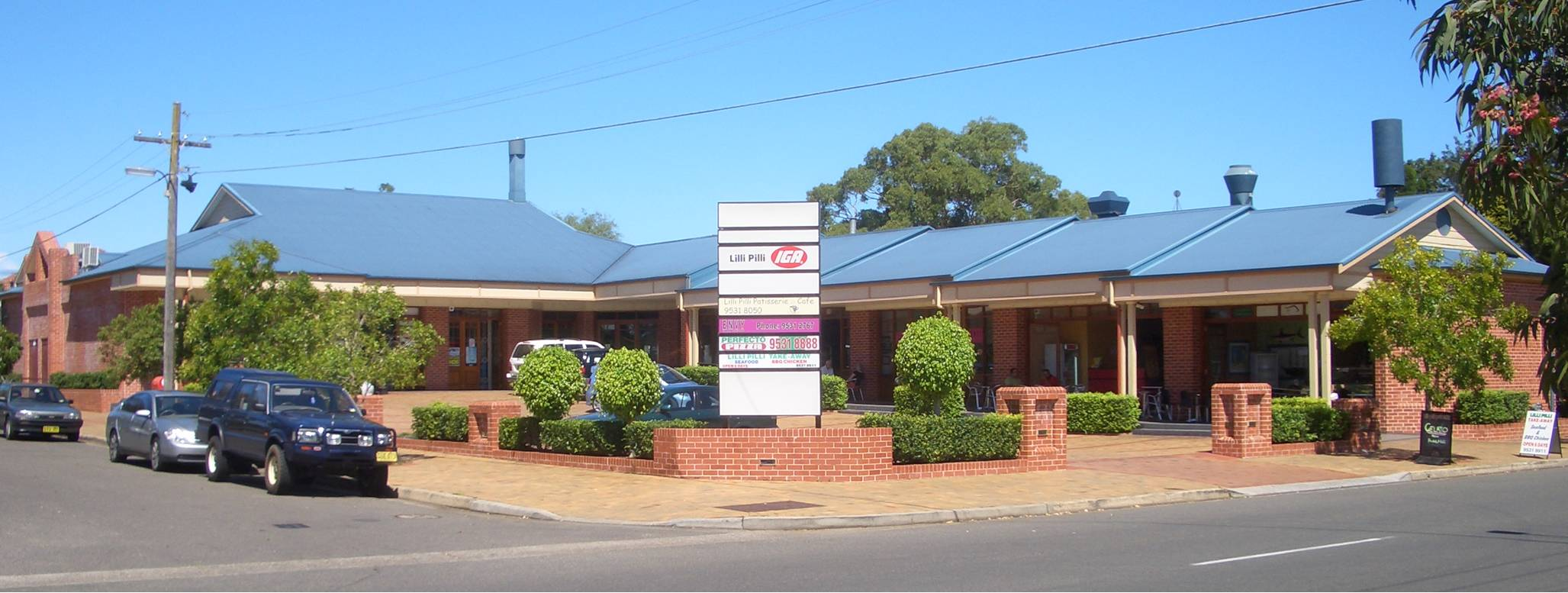
Lilli Pilli shops

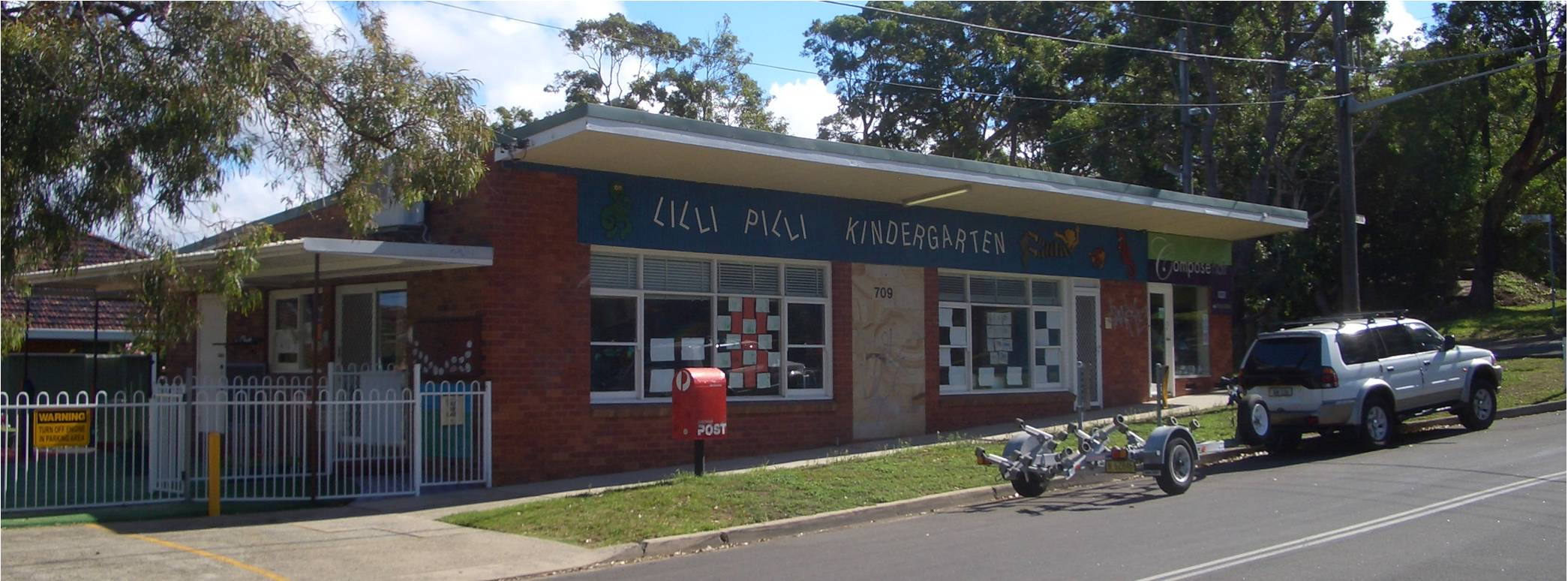
Lilli Pilli kindergarten

Lilli Pilli is a small suburb in southern Sydney, in the state of New South Wales, Australia. Lilli Pilli is located 26 kilometres south of the Sydney central business district, in the local government area of the Sutherland Shire.

== History ==
Lilli Pilli was named for the lilly pilly, the native myrtle that grew on the point. Thomas Holt (1811–88) owned most of the land that stretched from Sutherland to Cronulla, including land on the point. In 1840, parish maps also showed that 20 acres (8.1 ha) of land on the point were owned by Francis Mitchell. The public school opened in 1957, and celebrated its 50th anniversary in 2007.

== Geography ==
Lilli Pilli is located on the north shore of the Port Hacking estuary. The only adjacent suburbs are Caringbah South, Port Hacking and Dolans Bay. The villages of Maianbar and Bundeena are located on the opposite bank of Port Hacking.

Lilli Pilli is surrounded by Gannons Bay, Little Turriel Bay, Port Hacking River and Great Turriel Bay. Lilli Pilli Point is situated at the end of Lilli Pilli Point Road, off Port Hacking Road. Lilli Pilli Point Bushland Reserve overlooks Royal National Park. This bushland reserve is a great secluded picnic area that is often protected from the wind. A rock ledge runs along the northern point up to Speed Alley. Many fishing spots can be found here, all the way to Little Turriell Bay.

== Transport ==
U-Go Mobility operated an on demand mini bus service for a short time on bus route 977 from Lilli Pilli Point to Caringbah and Westfield Miranda on trial basis, at the end of the trial the service reverted back to a timetabled full sized bus service.

== Schools ==
- Lilli Pilli Primary School is on Lilli Pilli Point Road.
- Lilli Pilli Kindergarten is located nearby in Caringbah. The school has many sporting achievements, including the winning of the PSSA Soccer Division One Cup in 2008.

== Sport and recreation ==
Lilli Pilli is home to the Lilli Pilli Football Club. Their homeground is Lilli Pilli Oval but other fields are also used such as Caringbah Oval, Solander Fields, Captain Cook Oval and Breen Park. Lilli Pilli is also home to 1st Lilli Pilli Sea Scouts.

In 2019, upgrades commenced to Lilli Pilli Oval's facilities, including an upgraded playing surface and clubhouse

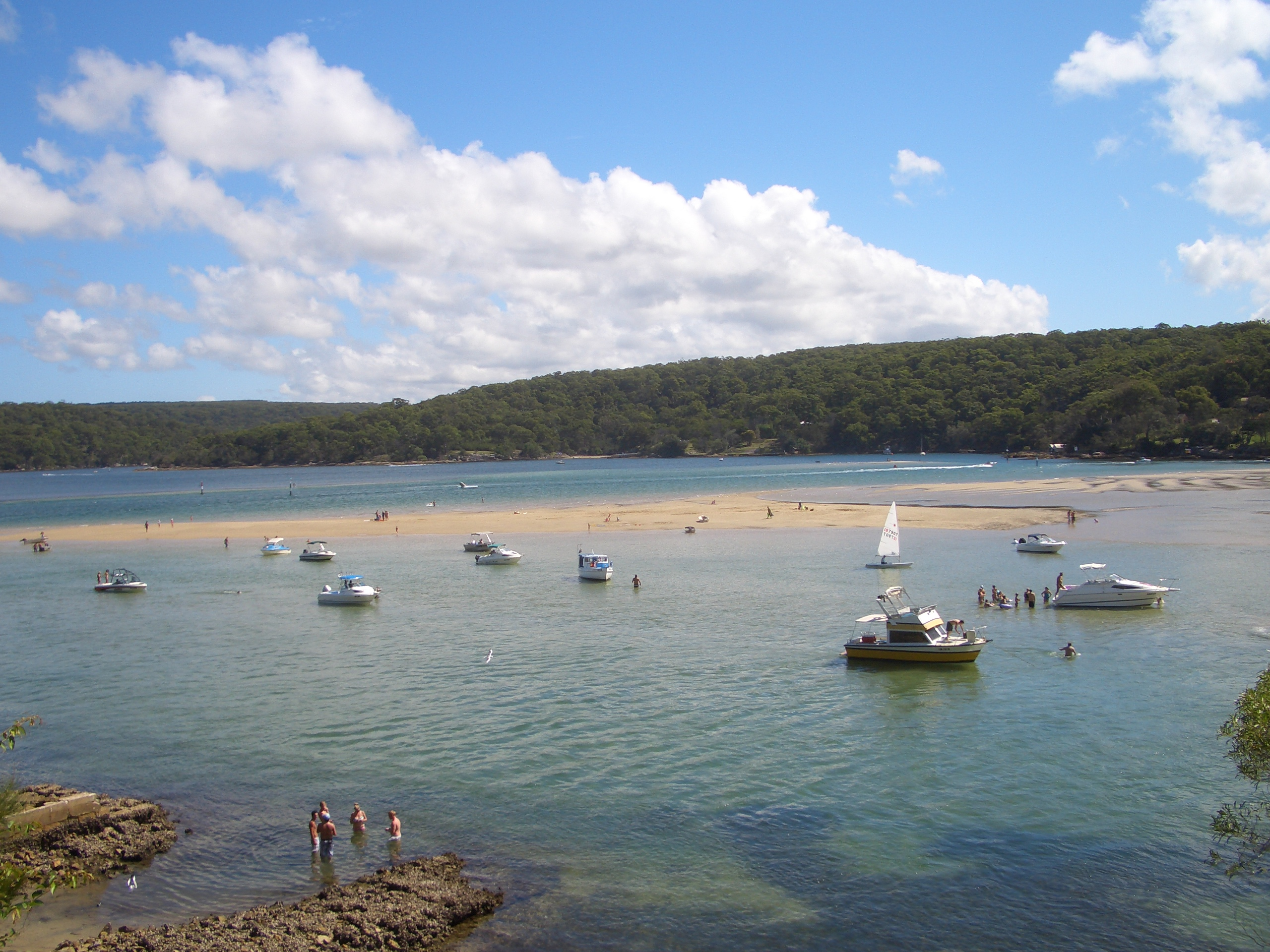
Port Hacking estuary at Lilli Pilli

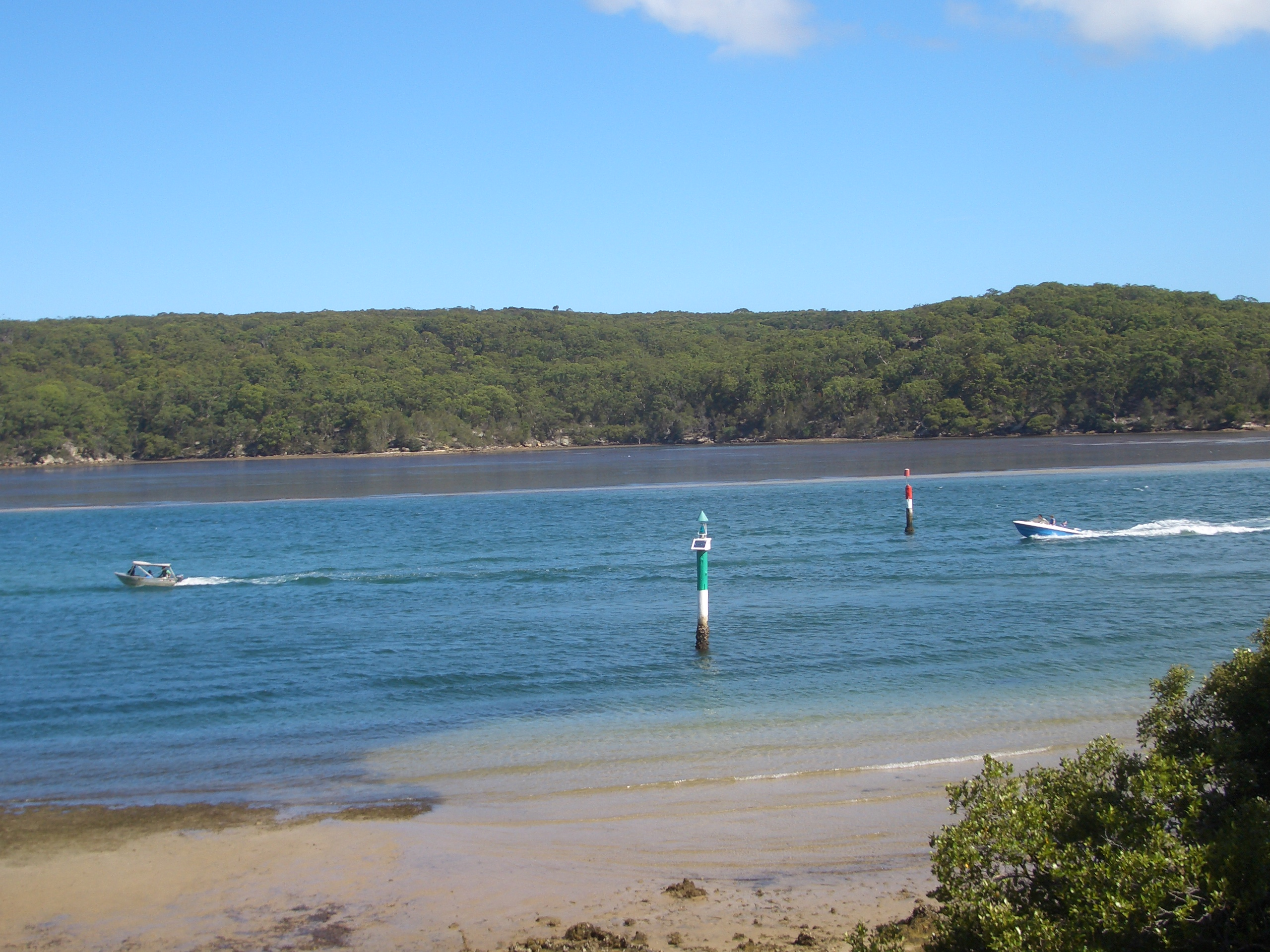
Port Hacking estuary at Lilli Pilli

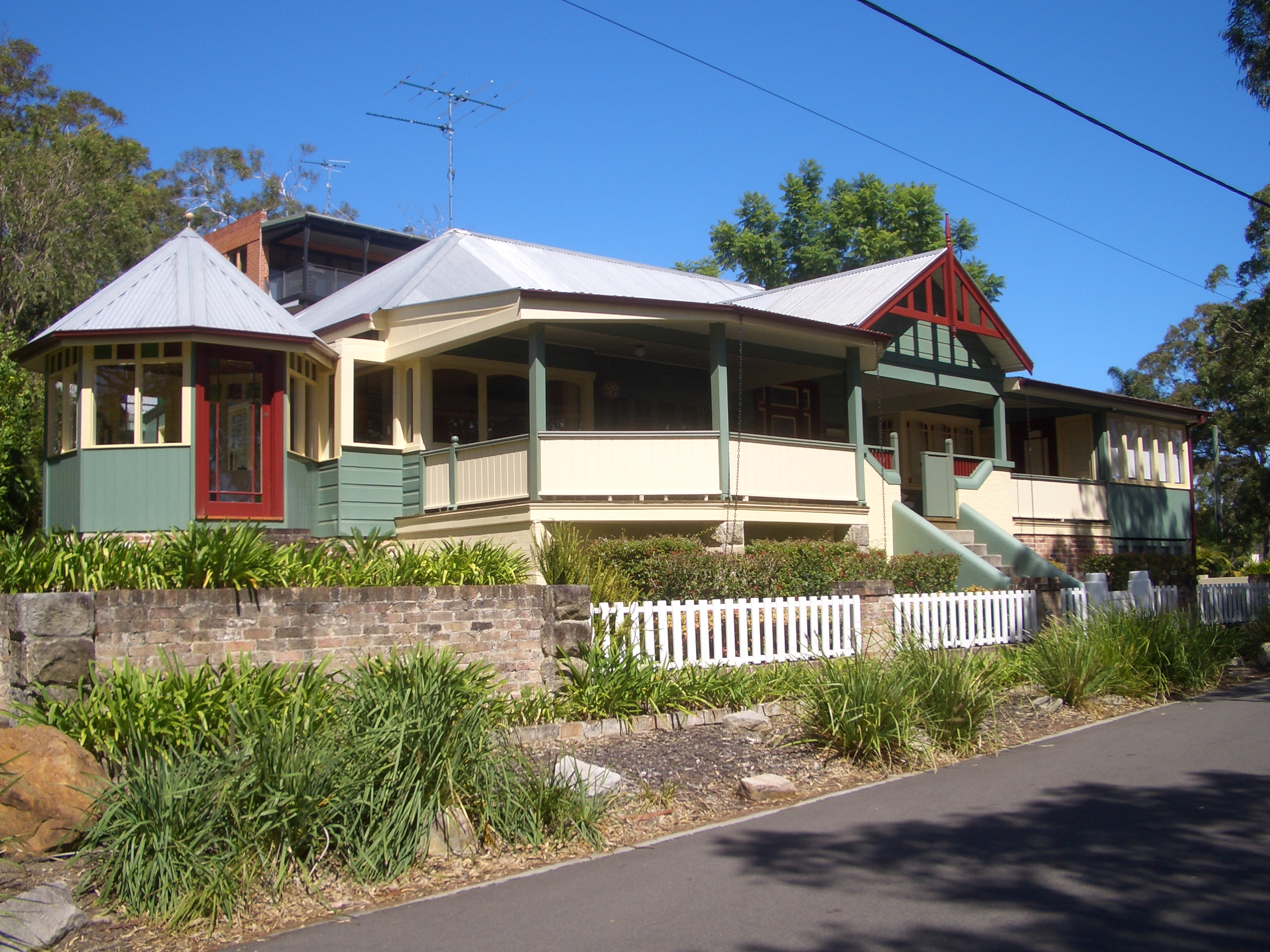
house on Lilli Pilli Point
