= Port Hacking, New South Wales =

Port Hacking
- Suburb
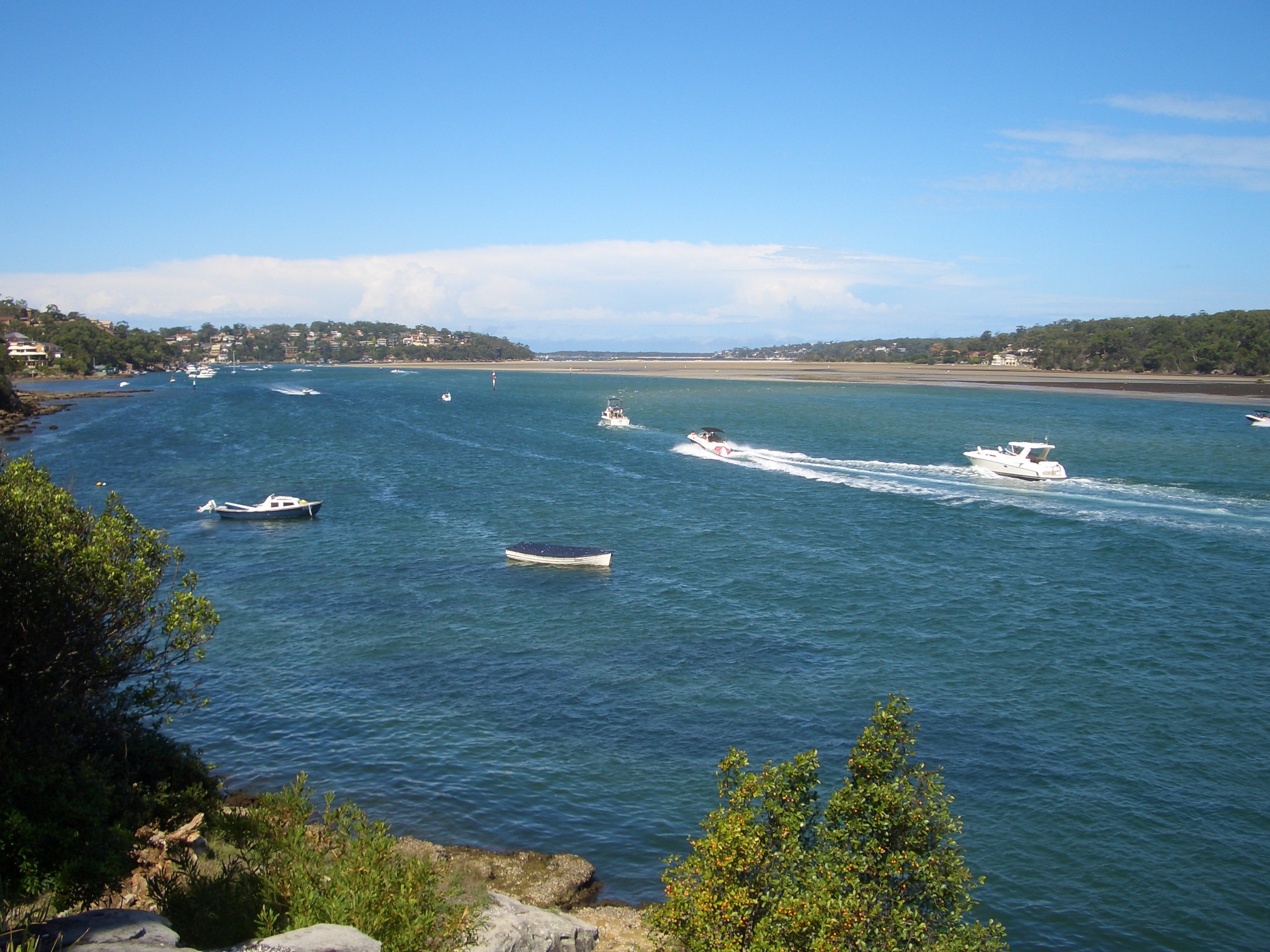
- Port Hacking estuary, view towards the heads

- Interactive map of Port Hacking
- Coordinates: 34°4′8″S 151°7′22″E
- Country: Australia
- State: New South Wales
- City: Sydney
- LGA: Sutherland Shire
- Location: 26 km (16 mi) south of Sydney CBD

Government
  - State electorate: Cronulla
  - Federal division: Cook
- Elevation: 47 m (154 ft)

Population
  - Total: 1,210 (2021 census)
- Postcode: 2229
Suburbs around Port Hacking
Caringbah South	Dolans Bay	Dolans Bay
Lilli Pilli	Port Hacking	Burraneer
Lilli Pilli	Royal National Park	Maianbar

Port Hacking is a small bayside suburb located on the north shore of the Port Hacking estuary in southern Sydney, in the state of New South Wales, Australia. The suburb is situated 26.7 kilometres south of the Sydney central business district in the local government area of the Sutherland Shire.

== History ==
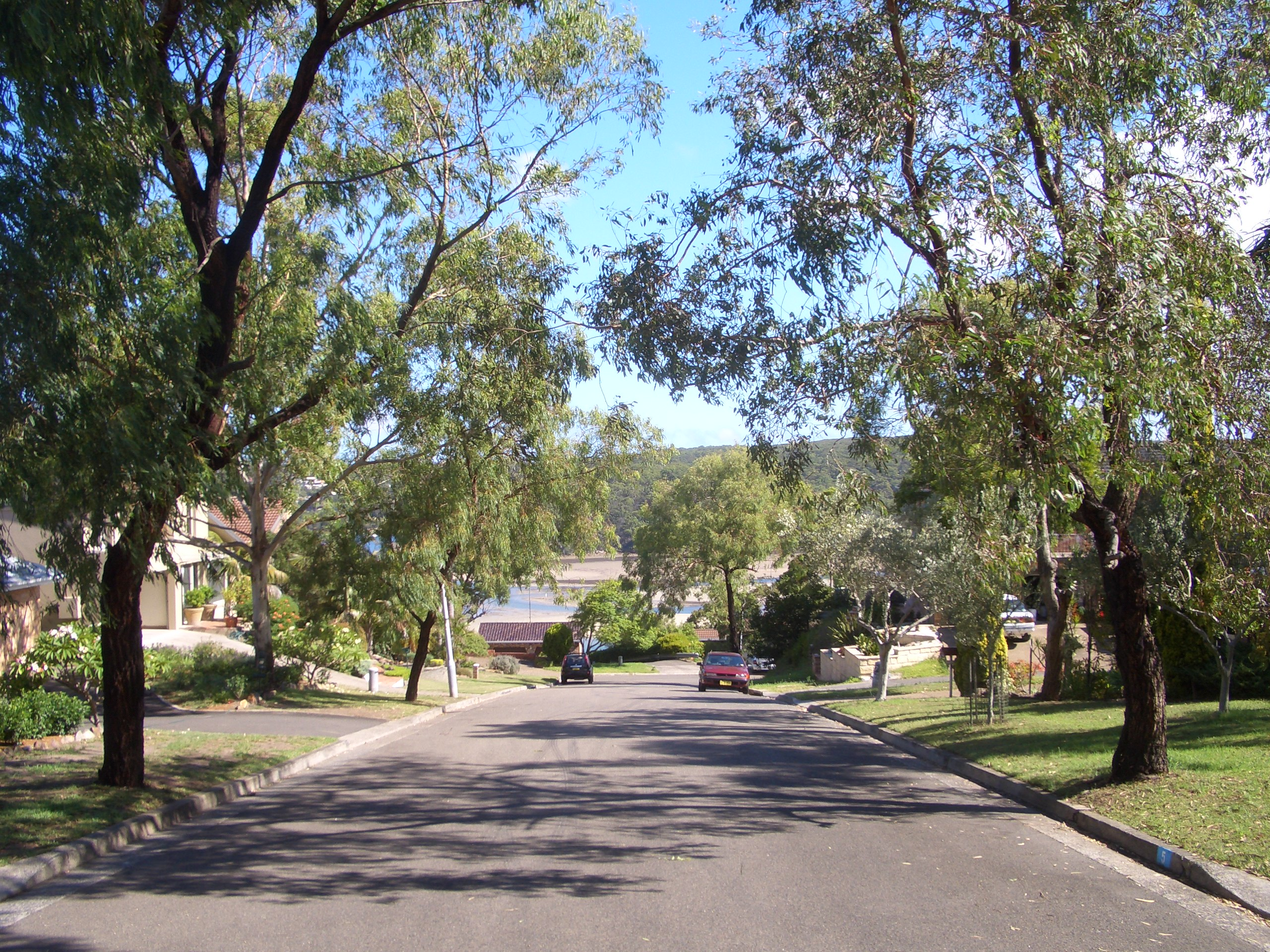
Sandbar Place, Port Hacking

The suburb name is the same as the name of the adjacent estuary.

Thomas Holt (1811–88) owned most of the land that stretched from Sutherland to Cronulla, including land here. In 1840, parish maps also showed that 20 acres (81,000 m^{2}) of land on this point were owned by Francis Mitchell. In 1858, Mary and Andrew Webster paid 108 pounds and 15 shillings plus a yearly peppercorn quit rent for their land in this area. The Websters sold their land to Dominick Dolan in 1863.

== Geography ==
Port Hacking is surrounded by the suburbs of Caringbah South to the north-west, Lilli Pilli to the south-west and Dolans Bay to the north-east. The suburbs of Maianbar and Bundeena are located on the opposite bank of Port Hacking.

Port Hacking is a residential suburb.

Shiprock Aquatic Reserve is within Burraneer Bay. Access to the aquatic reserve is via Shiprock Rd in Port Hacking.

== Commercial Area ==
Located on Port Hacking Road South, are a variety of specialty shops and professional services that service the surrounding suburbs of Port Hacking, Lilli Pilli, Dolans Bay and Caringbah South. These are a cellar, café, restaurant, butcher, florist, and reality agency, with many more small businesses. The strip of shops is most known for D'lish on Port, a café/restaurant.

== Demographics ==
According to the 2021 census, there were 1,210 residents in Port Hacking.

- 83.0% of people were born in Australia. The most common other countries of birth were England 3.8%, China 1.2%, Greece 0.9%, New Zealand 0.6% and Italy 0.5%.
- In Port Hacking, 86.9% of people only spoke English at home. Other languages spoken at home included Greek 2.6%, Mandarin 1.7%, Italian 1.2%, Cantonese 1.0% and Arabic 0.6%.
- The most common responses for religion in Port Hacking were Catholic 31.9%, No Religion 27.3%, Anglican 20.7%, Eastern Orthodox 5.2% and 3.1% did not state a religion.
- The average weekly household income in Port Hacking was $3,394, much higher in comparison to the New South Wales average of $1,829.

== Pop culture ==
Port Hacking was the hosting ground for Australia's Next Top Model series 4 in 2008.

== Notable people ==
- Ian Thorpe – Olympic Swimmer, a former resident
- Scott Morrison – Former Prime Minister of Australia

== Gallery ==
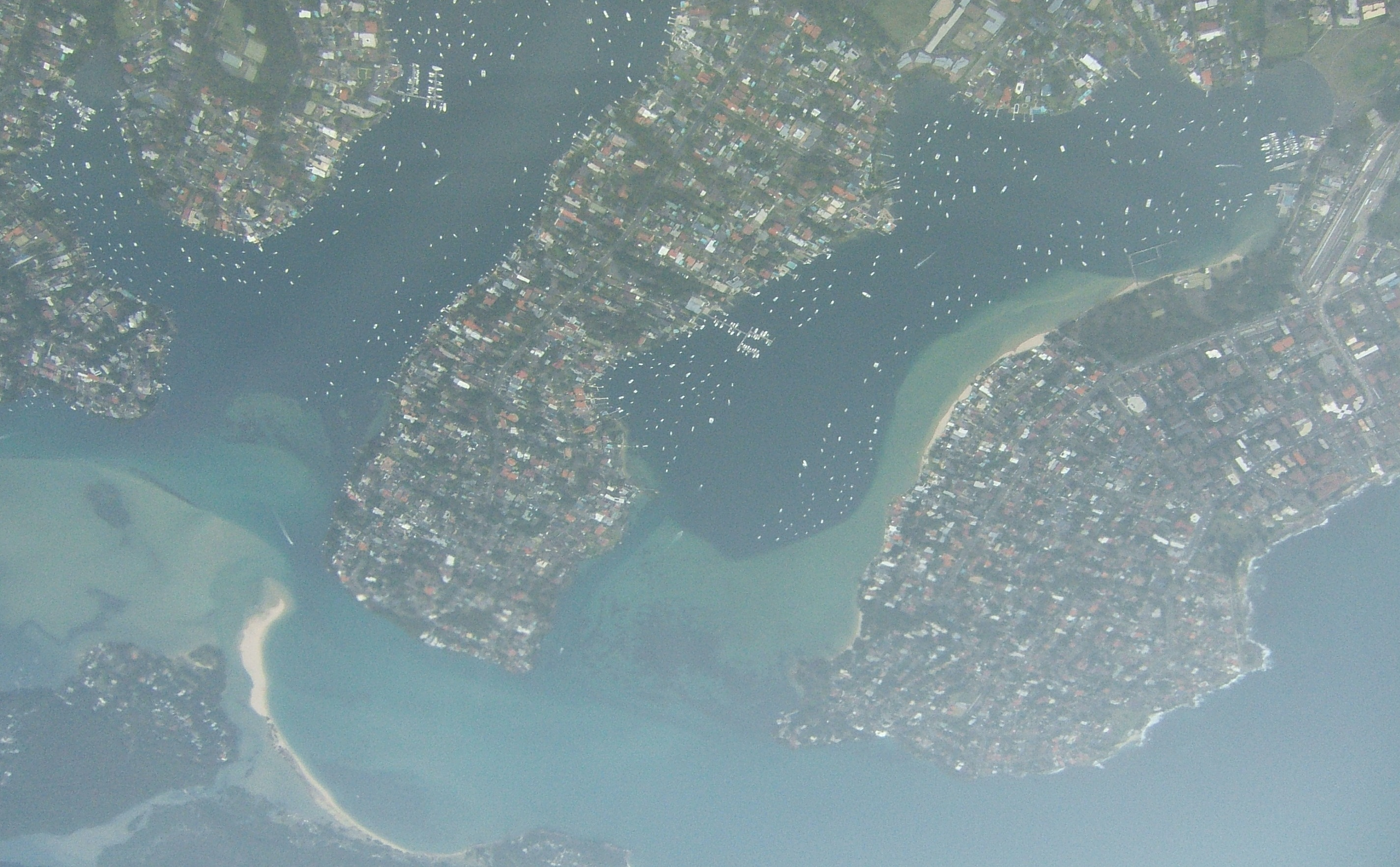
Aerial view of Port Hacking, Dolans Bay, Burraneer and Cronulla
