= Caringbah South =

- Suburb
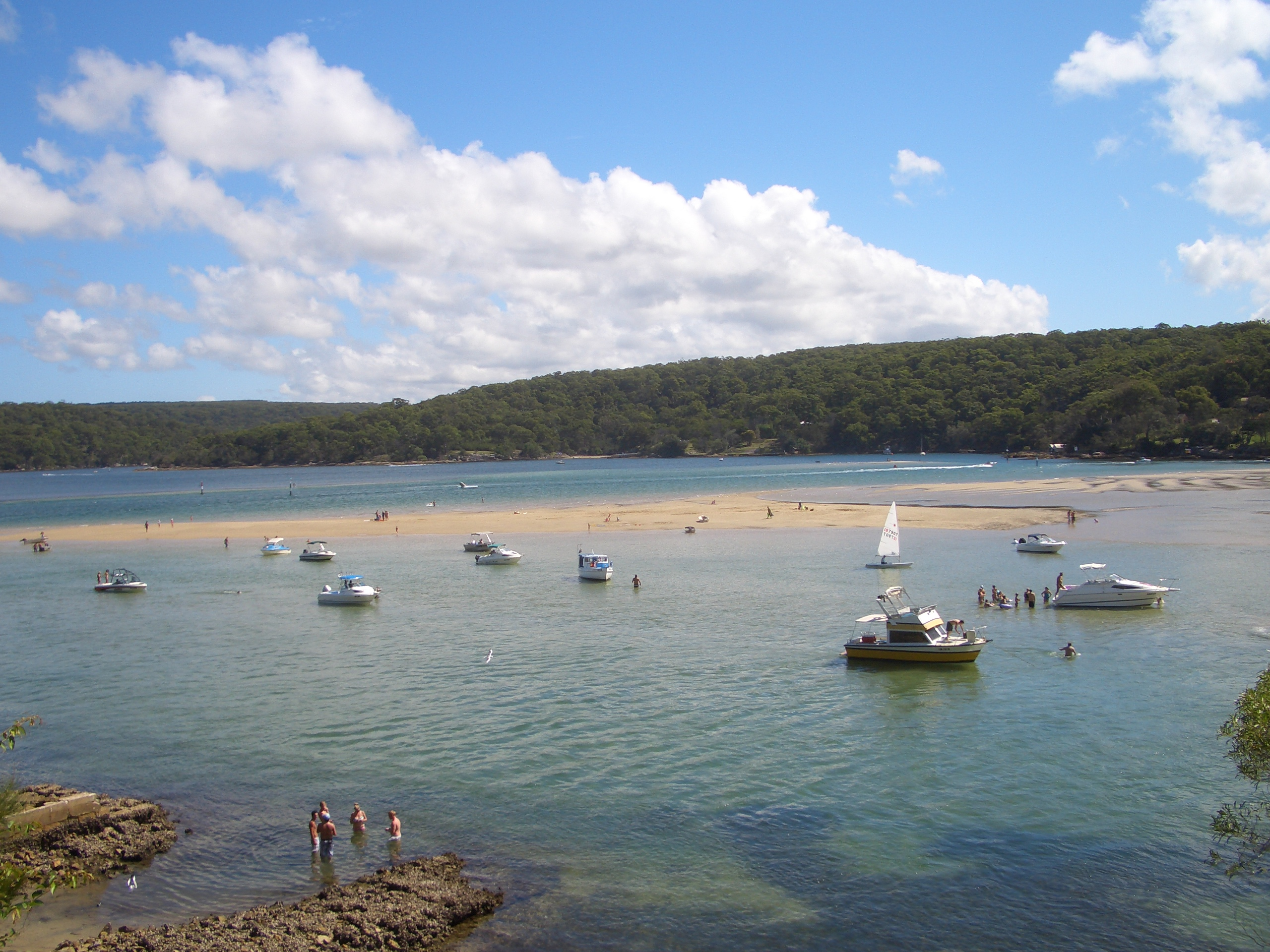
- Port Hacking, Caringbah South

- Interactive map of Caringbah South
- Country: Australia
- State: New South Wales
- City: Sydney
- LGA: Sutherland Shire
- Location: 25 km (16 mi) south of Sydney CBD

Government
  - State electorate: Cronulla
  - Federal division: Cook
- Elevation: 65 m (213 ft)

Population
  - Total: 13,168 (2021 census)
- Postcode: 2229
Suburbs around Caringbah South
Caringbah	Caringbah	Burraneer
Miranda	Caringbah South	Dolans Bay
Yowie Bay	Lilli Pilli	Port Hacking

Caringbah South is a suburb located on the Port Hacking coastline in southern Sydney, in the state of New South Wales, Australia. It is located 25 kilometres south of the Sydney central business district in the local government area of the Sutherland Shire.

Caringbah South sits on a peninsula, on the north shore of the Port Hacking estuary. The suburb forms the eastern border of Burraneer Bay and the western border of Yowie Bay. Caringbah is the only northern adjacent suburb, whilst Lilli Pilli, Dolans Bay and Port Hacking are adjacent southern suburbs.

== History ==
Caringbah South was once part of Caringbah but was declared a separate suburb in 2008.

There is a memorial fountain to Elizabeth Batts Cook, the wife of Captain James Cook, in the E. G. Waterhouse National Camellia Garden in Caringbah South.

== Heritage listings ==
Caringbah South has a number of heritage-listed sites, including:

- 44-46 Fernleigh Road: Fernleigh, Caringbah South

== Commercial area ==
Caringbah South is a small district made up mostly of small businesses specialising in professional services.

A small group of cafés and restaurants are located on Port Hacking Road South opposite Caringbah Public School. Another small group of shops is located even further south, close to the border of Lilli Pilli.

== Demographics ==
According to the 2021 census, there were 13,168 residents in Caringbah South.

- Aboriginal and Torres Strait Islander people made up 1.2% of the population.
- 82.4% of people were born in Australia. The most common other countries of birth were England 3.7% and New Zealand 1.2%.
- 88.7% of people spoke only English at home. Other languages spoken at home included Greek 1.5% and Italian 0.8%.
- The most common responses for religion were Catholic 31.5%, No Religion 31.2% and Anglican 18.7%.
- The median weekly household income was $2,721, in comparison to the New South Wales average of $1,829.

== Notable people ==
- Tahyna MacManus – actress
