= Horderns Beach =

Beach in New South Wales, Australia

- Beach
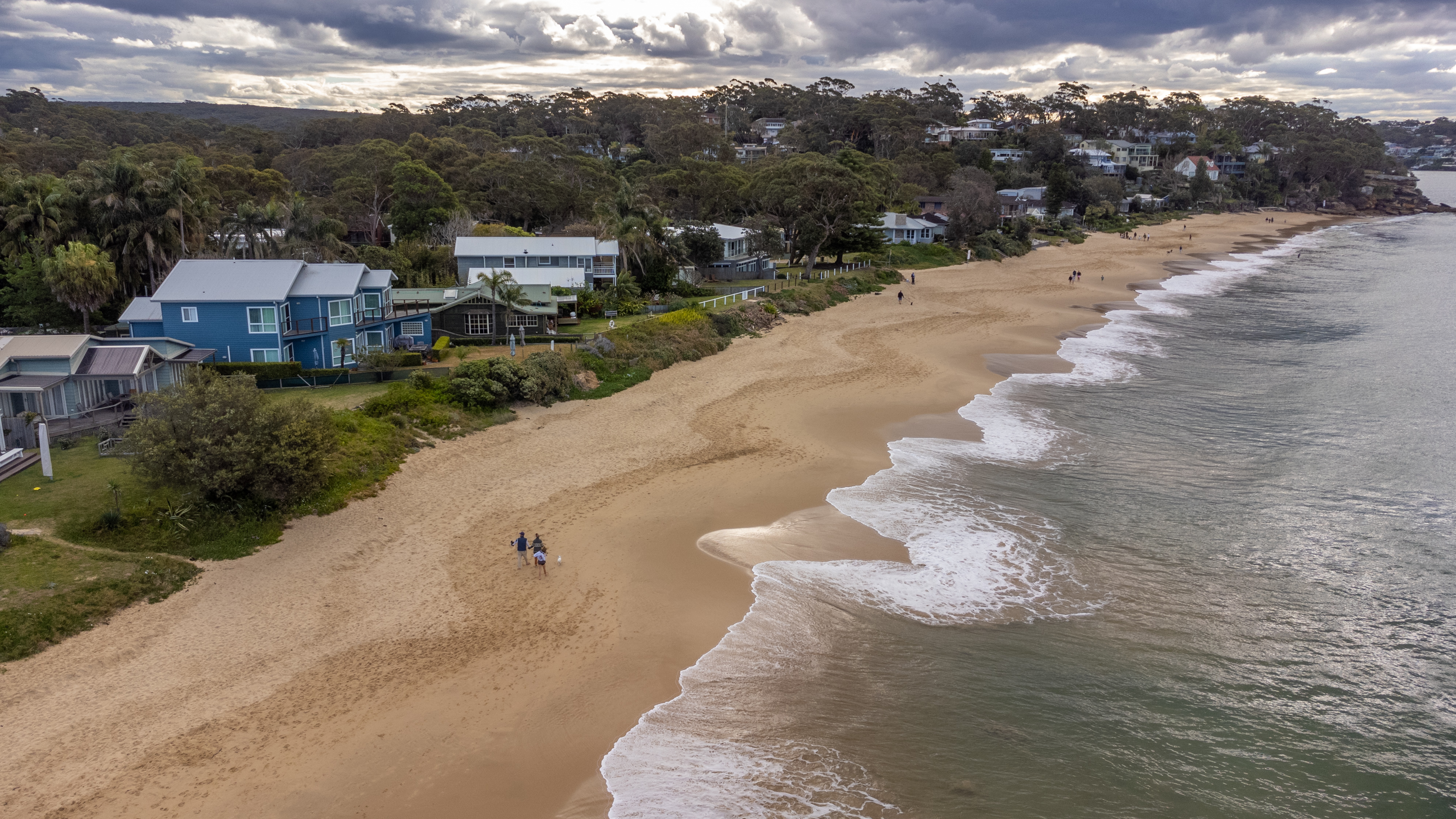
- View of Horderns Beach

- Coordinates: 34.08219°S 151.14679°E
- Location: Bundeena, New South Wales, Australia

Dimensions
  - Length: 580 m (634 yards)
- Hazard rating: 2/10 (least hazardous)

Horderns Beach is located in Bundeena, New South Wales. Beach is 580 meters long.
