= Cooman =

Gweagal man who possibly opposed James Cook in 1770

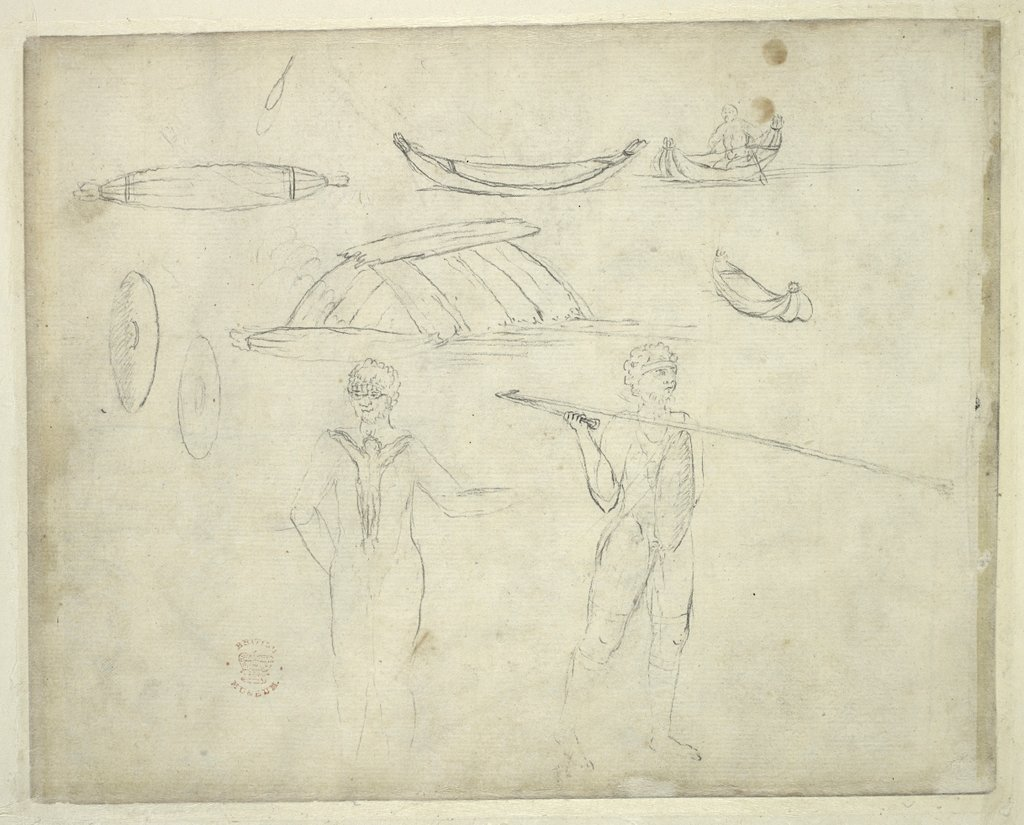
- The two Aboriginal warriors that Cook fought with, as depicted by Sydney Parkinson
- Born: around 1720; Gweagal Country

Cooman was a Gweagal man identified by some of his descendants as the warrior who was shot and wounded by James Cook's landing party at Kamay (Botany Bay) in 1770. He was previously unnamed in historical documents, and his identity has been disputed within the local Aboriginal community. Little is known of Cooman's life apart from his possible involvement in this incident.

== Life ==
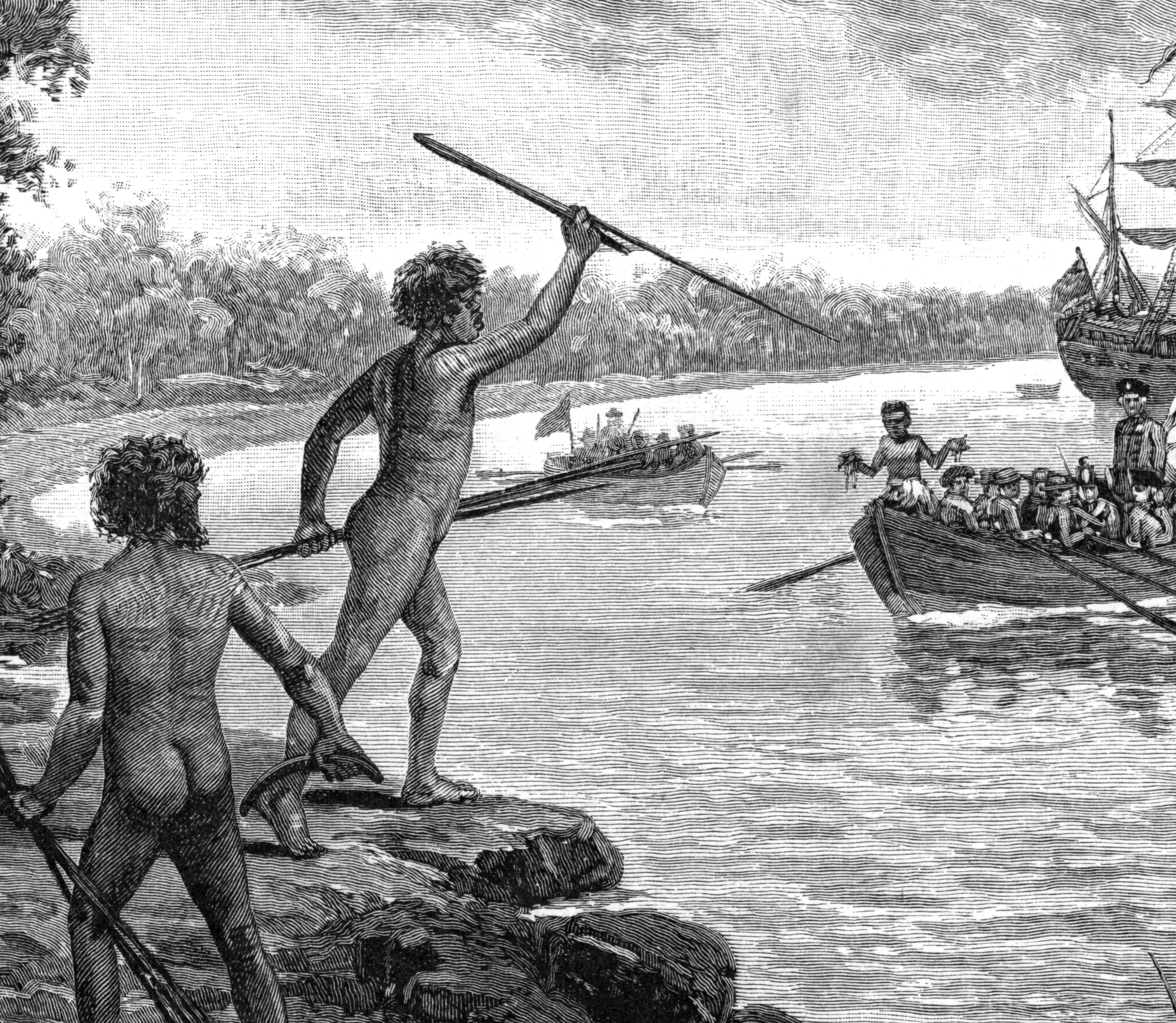
Dramatisation of the Aboriginal warriors opposing Cook's landing at Kamay (Botany Bay)

Little is documented of Cooman's life. He is mainly known through the oral histories of some of his descendants who state that Cooman was the older of the two Gweagal men who opposed the landing of James Cook and his crew at Kamay (later named Botany Bay) in 1770.

During Cook's first voyage to the Pacific, he charted the east coast of the Australian continent and claimed it for Britain.

On 29 April 1770, Cook and crew attempted their first landfall on the continent at a beach now known as Silver Beach at Botany Bay (Kamay). The older warrior, who some identify as Cooman, and another Gweagal man came down to the beach to fend off what they thought to be spirits of the dead. They shouted "warra warra wai" meaning 'you are all dead' and gestured with their spears. Cook's party attempted to communicate their desire for water and threw gifts of beads and nails ashore. The two Aboriginal men continued to oppose the landing and Cook fired a warning shot. The older warrior responded by throwing a rock, and Cook shot him in the leg with small shot. The crew then landed, and the Gweagal men threw two spears before Cook shot at them again and they retreated. The crew took their spears and shield and Cook found several children in nearby huts, and left some beads with them. The shield taken is now known as the Gweagal shield.

"Shaking their lances and menacing, (they) in all appearances resolved to dispute our landing to the utmost though they were two and we were 30 or 40 at least. They remained resolute so a musket was fired over them. A musket loaded with small shot was now fired at the eldest of the two ... It struck him on the legs but he minded it very little so another was immediately fired."

— Joseph Banks

... I fired a musket between the two which had no other effect than to make them retire back where bundles of their darts lay and one of them took up a stone and threw at us which caused my fireing a second Musquet load with small shott and altho' some of the shott struck the man yet it had no other effect than to make him lay hold of a ^Shield or target ^to defend himself ...

— James Cook, Cook's Journal: Diary Entries - 29 April 1770

== Disputed identity ==
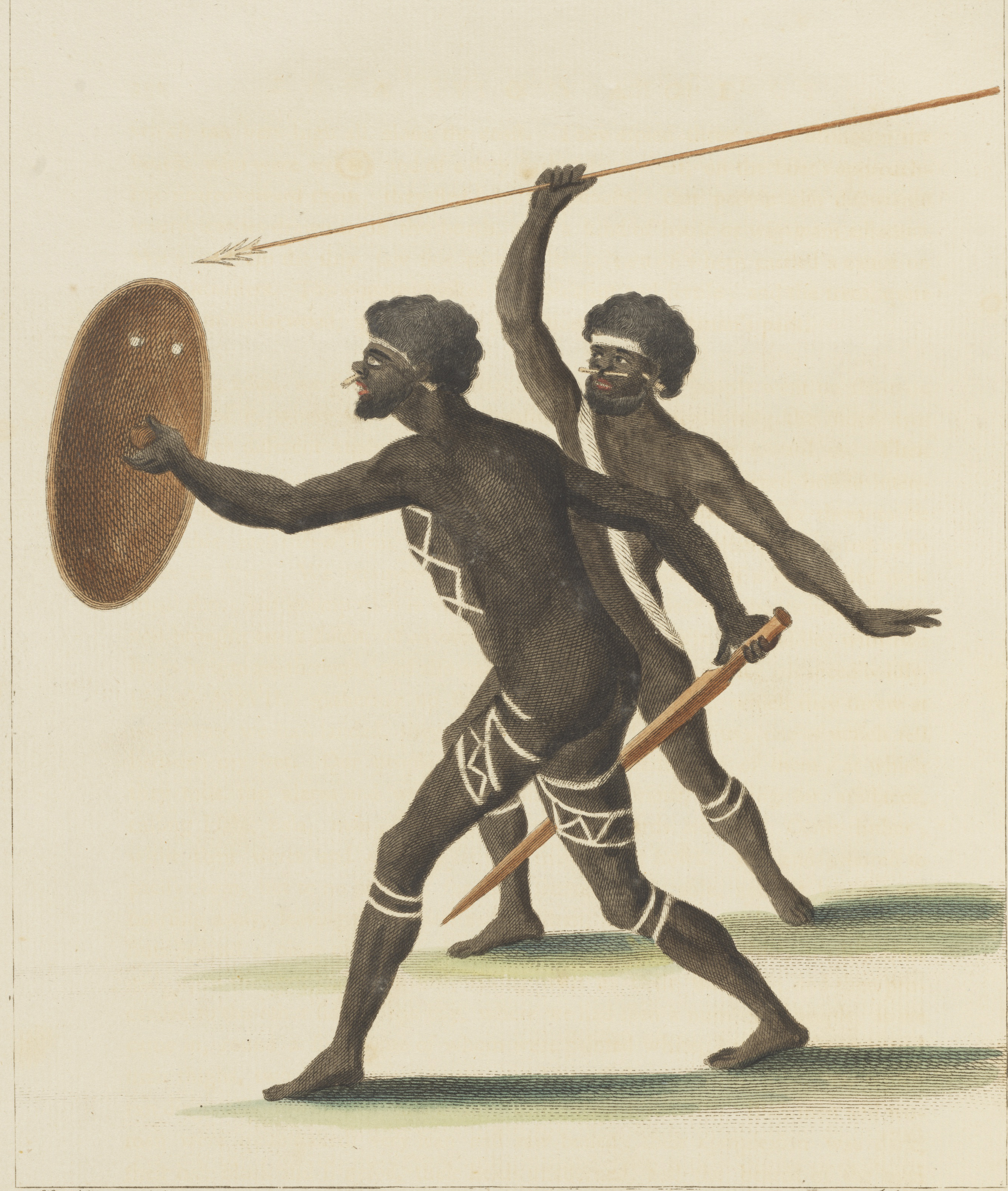
Dramatisation of the two Gweagal men.

The name of Cooman as the warrior shot by Cook has been disputed. In 2020, Noeleen Timbery of the Gujaga Foundation stated there were a "number of more feasible candidates present within the oral histories kept by Aboriginal families belonging to the area". Academic Maria Nugent, writing with Gaye Sculthorpe of the British Museum, states that there is "no consensus" that Cooman was one of the warriors. However, many sources, primarily drawing from Biddy Giles, Keith Vincent Smith, and Rodney Kelly, refer to Cooman as the man shot and wounded in the leg by Cook.

The identification of Cooman as the name of the wounded warrior stems from an 1840s oral history told by Biddy Giles which was subsequently recorded. Biddy stated that Cooman was the grandfather of her husband, also called Cooman, who was often described as ‘the last of the Georges River Tribe’. Smith cites a 1905 document recounting the 1840s oral history told by Biddy Giles. However, there were several documented Coomans in Sydney, and it is not clear who Biddy's husband was. Maria Nugent calls Smith's identification of Cooman as the Gweagal spearman on this basis "a mere assertion" based on "inconclusive evidence" and "a questionable interpretative leap."

== Legacy ==
Cooman fathered a lineage spanning at least six generations. His descendants Theresa Ardler and Rodney Kelly have campaigned for the return of a shield from the British Museum which later analysis has shown is likely not the shield collected by Cook's party from Botany Bay. In 2021, spears collected by Banks during the encounter were returned by Cambridge University to the La Perouse Aboriginal Land Council.

In August 2016, as part of Kelly's campaign, a motion passed the New South Wales Legislative Council acknowledging the Gweagal people as the “rightful owners” of the shield and spears and identifying Cooman as the man who was shot by Cook's party. In October 2016, a similar motion was adopted by the Australian Senate, identifying Cooman as the man shot by Cook.

Theresa Ardler, a descendant of Cooman, is one of the Dharawal community working with libraries, museums and linguists to tell the story of Cook's landing from an Aboriginal perspective in an attempt to correct misrepresentations of the encounter.

There have been several other people named Cooman in the Sydney region who should not be confused with this Cooman. It is unclear if this Cooman is the grandfather of a later Cooman ('King Kooma'), an Aboriginal man who lived in the Liverpool region and who the local Aboriginal Cooman surname comes from.

== See also ==
- Gweagal shield
- Gweagal
