= Gweagal shield =

Aboriginal Australian artefact

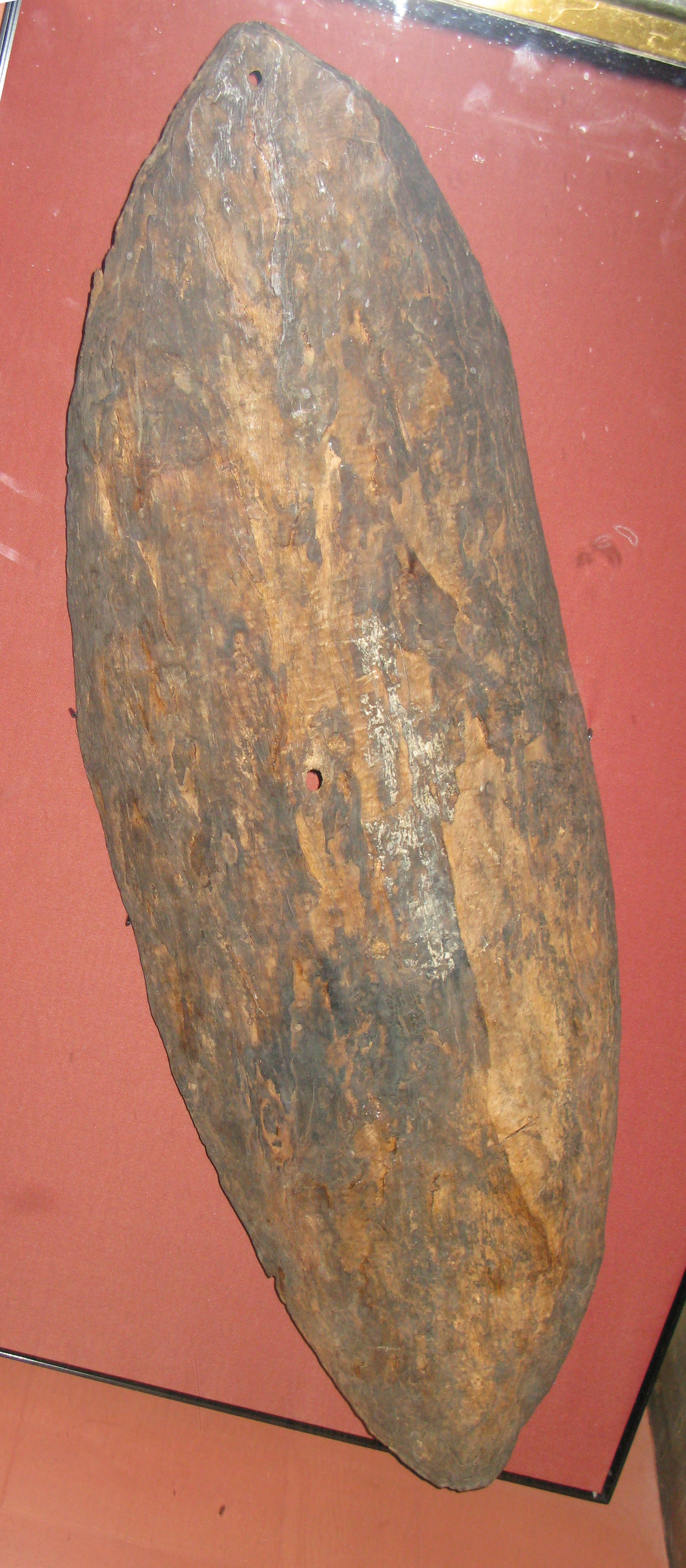
The Aboriginal shield in the British Museum previously thought to be the Gweagal shield

The Gweagal shield is an Aboriginal Australian shield dropped by a Gweagal warrior opposing James Cook's landing party at Botany Bay on 29 April 1770. The shield was recovered by Joseph Banks and taken back to England, but it is unclear whether the shield still exists. An Aboriginal shield held by the British Museum, and once thought to be the Gweagal shield, is more likely to originate from an area further north. It is currently the subject of a campaign for its repatriation to Australia.

== History ==
=== The "Gweagal" shield ===
During his first voyage of discovery, James Cook's landing at Botany Bay on 29 April 1770 was opposed by two Aboriginal warriors from the Gweagal clan. Cook and his landing party attempted to communicate their desire for water and offered the Aboriginal warriors gifts of nails and beads. The two warriors launched stones and spears at the landing party which responded with small shot from their muskets. One of the warriors was wounded and they both retreated, leaving behind spears and a shield. Joseph Banks collected 40–50 spears, and it is likely that he also took a shield back with him to England.

A shield "from New Holland", "piercd [sic]… near the center", was among the artefacts Banks brought back to London in 1771. There is evidence that the shield might have passed from Banks’ hands into those of his servant, James Roberts, who had accompanied him on the Endeavour voyage, and was then acquired by liberal politician and collector John Bowes (1811–85). Although the shield is no longer in the Bowes Museum, Nicholas Thomas concludes: "It should not be assumed that the shield has been definitively lost. It may well have entered another museum, where it may be preserved among collections that have not been fully catalogued or photographed."

=== Aboriginal shield in the British Museum ===
The British Museum holds an Aboriginal shield which it had previously identified as probably the one acquired from Botany Bay in 1770. The shield was lent to the National Museum of Australia in Canberra for an exhibition called Encounters: Revealing stories of Aboriginal and Torres Strait Islander objects from the British Museum, from November 2015 to March 2016. Shayne Williams, a Gweagal elder of the La Perouse Community of Botany Bay, saw the shield, thought it was not typical of locally made shields, and asked the British Museum to further investigate its provenance.

In November 2016, the British Museum began investigating the provenance of the shield held by them. They held a workshop involving various experts, including curators from both the British and Australian Museums, academics from the Royal Armouries, Cambridge and the Australian National University, and two Aboriginal representatives from the La Perouse community. The results of the investigations were published in 2018. Testing of the shield found that its wood is red mangrove, which can be obtained only at least 500 kilometres north of Botany Bay. The hole in the shield was inspected by a ballistics expert who concluded that it was not made by a firearm. Nicholas Thomas, director and curator of the Museum of Archaeology and Anthropology at Cambridge, also found that the shield in the British Museum does not closely match the 1771 detailed drawing of the shield collected by Banks. Based on the available evidence, Thomas concludes that the shield in the British Museum is not the shield taken from Botany Bay in April 1770. Maria Nugent and Gaye Sculthorpe state that the evidence for a connection between the shield in the British Museum and James Cook is relatively scant. However, Shayne Williams states that it is very likely a Gugu Yimidhirr shield acquired by Cook during his stay at the Endeavour River in north Queensland (a region where red mangrove is abundant).

=== Campaign for repatriation ===
Following the Encounters exhibition, Rodney Kelly, a Gweagal man from Bermagui, started a campaign for the return of the shield to Australia, along with some Aboriginal spears held in Cambridge. His campaign for its return has since involved three visits to Britain, one in 2016 and two in 2017. Green Party–sponsored motions in support of Mr Kelly’s campaign have been passed in both the New South Wales Legislative Council and the Australian Senate. Nicholas Thomas states that his conclusion that the shield in the British Museum is not the Gweagal shield does not imply that the shield should not be repatriated. The British Museum has denied the request for repatriation as British law does not permit it to do so. Gaye Sculthorpe, an Indigenous curator at the British Museum, argues that the shield should remain in the museum as it tells a story of the British and Aboriginal Australia, and it is important that Aboriginal history and culture are understood throughout the world. Noeleen Timbery, the chair of the La Perouse Local Aboriginal Land Council, states that, while she understands that the shield would not exist if it had not been preserved by the British Museum, she supports its return to Australia.

The spears left behind by the two Gweagal warriors who confronted Cook's party in April 1770, and collected by Joseph Banks, were donated to Trinity College, Cambridge the following year. From 1914, they were looked after by Cambridge University's Museum of Archaeology and Anthropology. In March 2023, it was reported that Trinity College had agreed to repatriate the spears to the local Indigenous community and that they would be displayed in a new visitor centre.

== Cultural significance ==
Nugent and Sculthorpe state that the shield's presumed association with the violent encounter between Aboriginal people and the Endeavour crew at Botany Bay in 1770 made it a powerful symbol for the traumatic history of unjust colonial relations. They argue that despite the evidence that the shield in the British Museum is not associated with Cook, it is valuable as the earliest surviving shield used by Aboriginal people on Australia’s east coast, and as an example of a shield type about which little is known. According to Thomas, "the shield in the British Museum is, irrespective of its specific provenance, certainly a rare, early example and undoubtedly a highly significant expression of the heritage of the particular Aboriginal groups concerned." Shayne Williams states that the "shield…would have strong meaning for Aboriginal people right across the country, and Torres Strait Islander people as well".
