= Museum of Archaeology and Anthropology, University of Cambridge =

Museum of Archeology and Anthropology
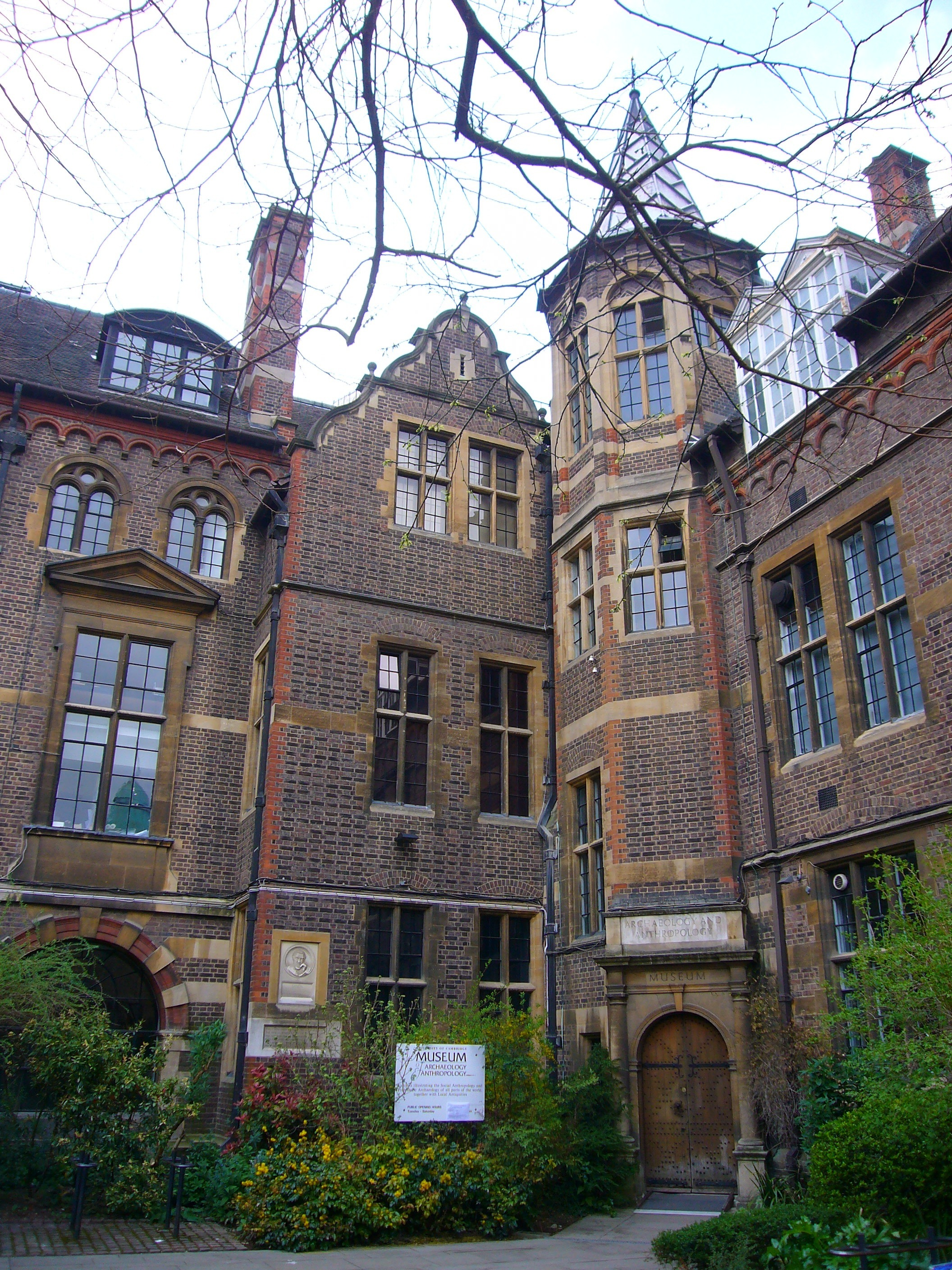
- Museum of Archeology and Anthropology, Cambridge
- Location: Cambridge
- Coordinates: 52°12′09.63″N 0°07′15.05″E
- Type: University Museum
- Collections: local antiquities, together with archaeological and ethnographic artefacts from around the world
- Visitors: 76,669 (2019)
- Director: Nicholas Thomas
- Owner: University of Cambridge

University of Cambridge Museums
- Fitzwilliam Museum; Kettle's Yard; Museum of Archaeology and Anthropology; Museum of Classical Archaeology; Whipple Museum of the History of Science; Sedgwick Museum of Earth Sciences; The Polar Museum; Museum of Zoology

The Museum of Archaeology and Anthropology, also known as MAA, at the University of Cambridge houses the university's collections of local antiquities, together with archaeological and ethnographic artefacts from around the world. The museum is located on the university's Downing Site, on the corner of Downing Street and Tennis Court Road. In 2013 it reopened following a major refurbishment of the exhibition galleries, with a new public entrance directly on to Downing Street.

The museum is part of the University of Cambridge Museums consortium.

== History ==
Founded in 1884 as the university's Museum of General and Local Archaeology, the museum's initial collections included local antiquities collected by the Cambridge Antiquarian Society and artefacts from Polynesia donated by Alfred Maudslay and Sir Arthur Gordon. Anatole von Hügel, the museum's first curator donated his own collection of artefacts from the South Pacific. More material was collected by the 1898 Cambridge anthropological expedition to the Torres Strait under Alfred Haddon and W. H. R. Rivers. Haddon and Rivers would encourage their Cambridge students — including Alfred Radcliffe-Brown, John Layard and Gregory Bateson — to continue to collect for the museum in their ethnographic fieldwork.

Von Hügel set in motion a move to larger, specially built, premises: in 1913 the museum moved to its present location in Downing Street, although the new galleries were not fully installed until after World War I. Various depositions and donations of eighteenth-century collections — including material collected on James Cook's three expeditions — were made to the museum in the 1910s and 1920s.

The MAA reopened after a lengthy refurbishment in 2013, with a completely redeveloped ground floor, new temporary exhibition space and new archaeology galleries.

Von Hügel's successors as curator have been Louis Colville Gray Clarke (from 1922 to 1937), Thomas Paterson (from 1937 to 1948), Geoffrey Bushnell (from 1948 to 1970), Peter Gathercole (from 1970 to 1981), David Phillipson (1981 to 2006), and the 2006–present director, Nicholas Thomas.

The Museum is part of True Echoes, a joint research project with the British Museum, looking at the use of audio recordings within anthropology and mapping connections between related collections of objects, photographs, and field notes.

The Grade II listed regional seat of government nuclear bunker on Brooklands Avenue, Cambridge, is now a store, the Centre for Material Culture, for the museum.

The museum held a collection of Ugandan artefacts acquired during the colonial period. In 2024, 32 of these objects were returned to Uganda Museum under a loan arrangement for research and exhibition.

== Museum displays ==
The museum's current displays are arranged on three floors:

- Ground floor: The Clarke Hall: Archaeology of Cambridge and the Li Ka Shing Gallery (Temporary Exhibitions)
- First floor: The Maudslay Hall: Anthropology
- Second floor: Andrews Gallery: World Archaeology

The museum building, which is Grade II listed, incorporates the central section of Inigo Jones's choir screen from Winchester Cathedral.

A display on the Anglo-Saxon Trumpington bed burial is on the ground floor.

== Gweagal spears ==
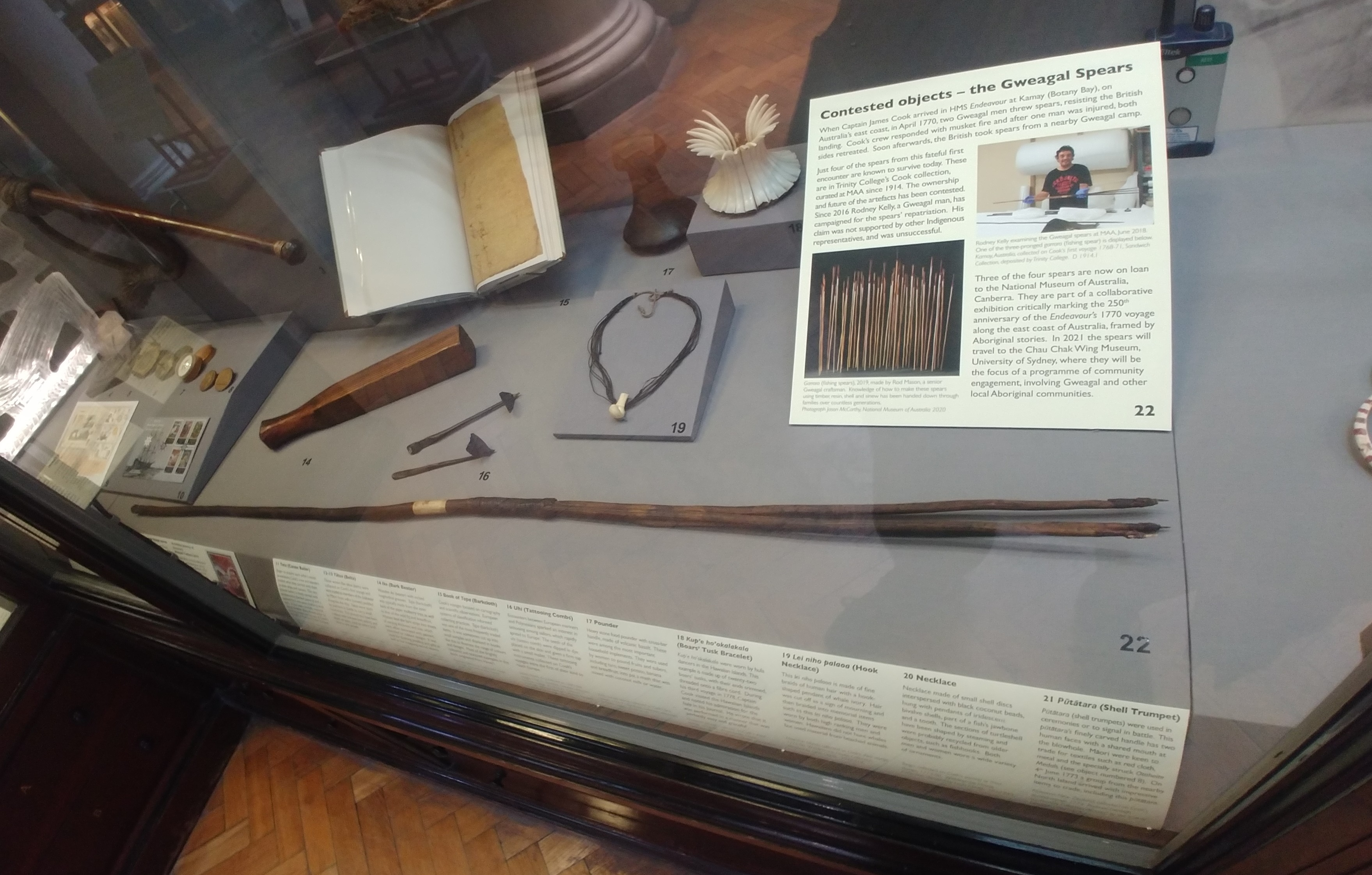
Gweagal spear on display at the museum

In 1770, after returning to England from their voyage in the South Pacific Ocean, Captain James Cook and botanist Joseph Banks brought with them, along with a large collection of flora and fauna, many cultural artefacts. These included a collection of roughly fifty Australian Aboriginal spears that belonged to the Gweagal people. The spears were given to Cook's patron John Montagu, 4th Earl of Sandwich, who then gave them to his alma mater Trinity College, and four are still in existence. The spears are among the few remaining artefacts that can be traced back to Cook's first voyage. Although the Gweagal Spears remain in the ownership of Trinity College, they are on display at the museum.

== Gallery ==
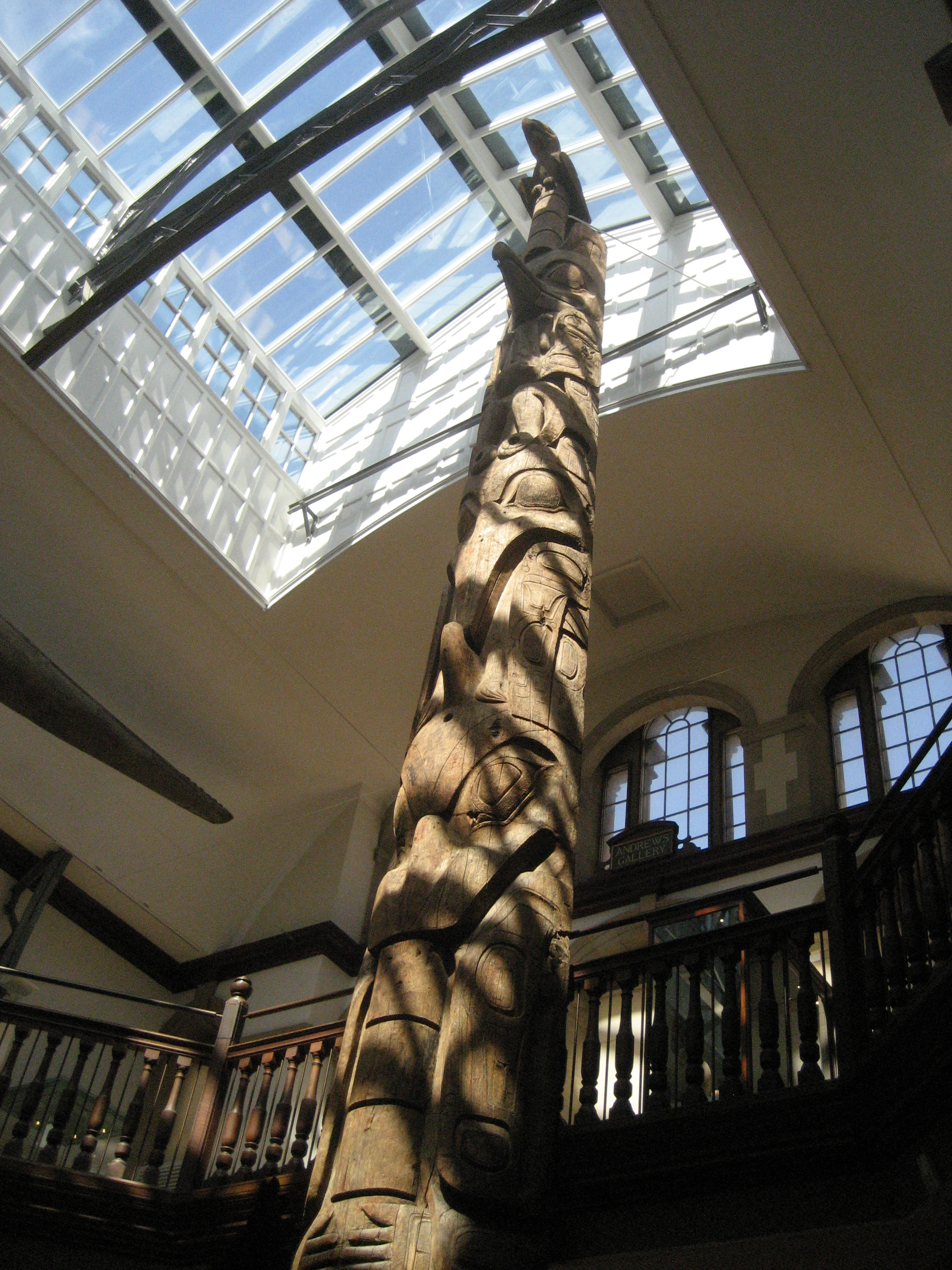
Haida totem pole

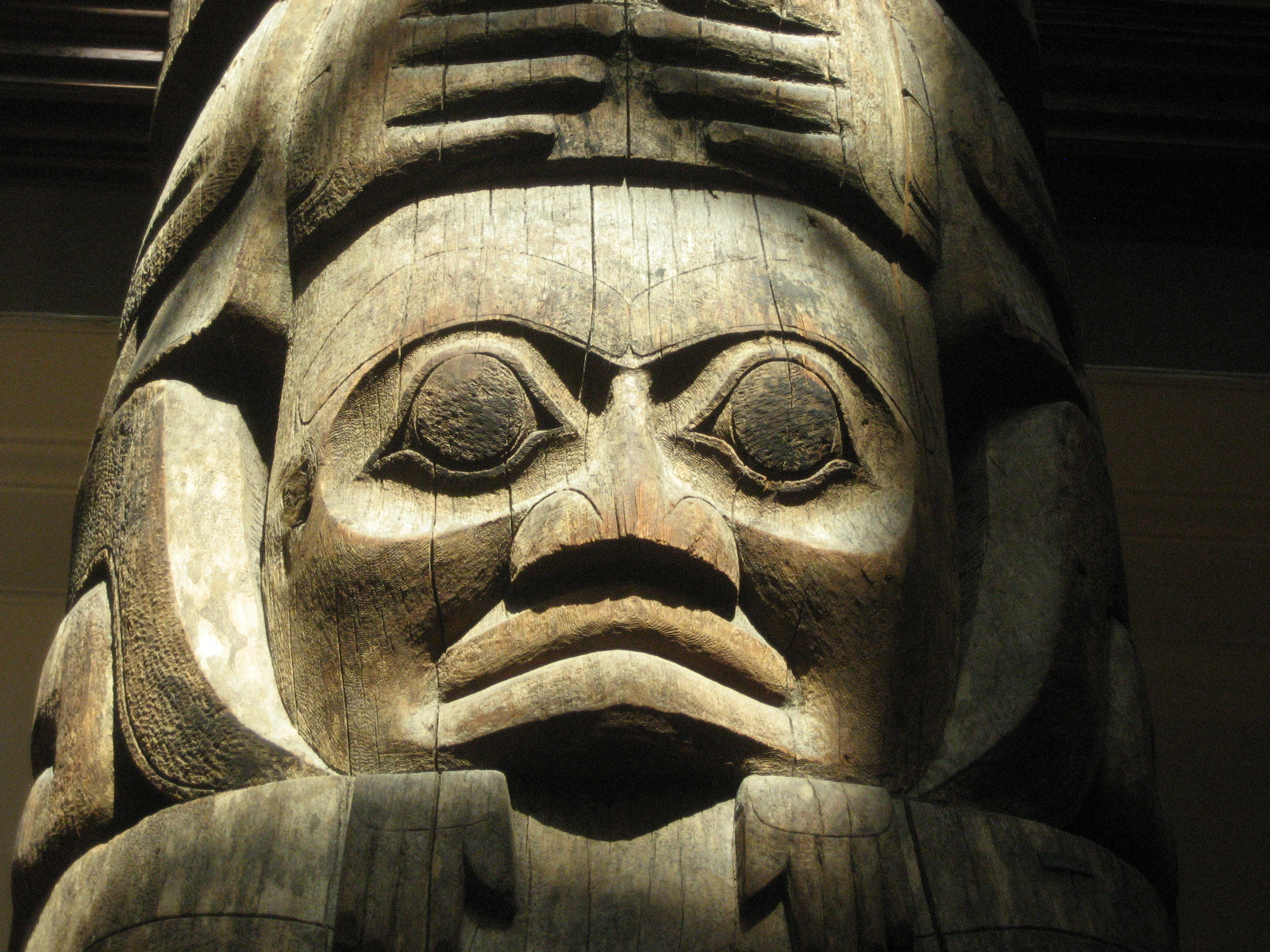
Haida totem pole (detail)

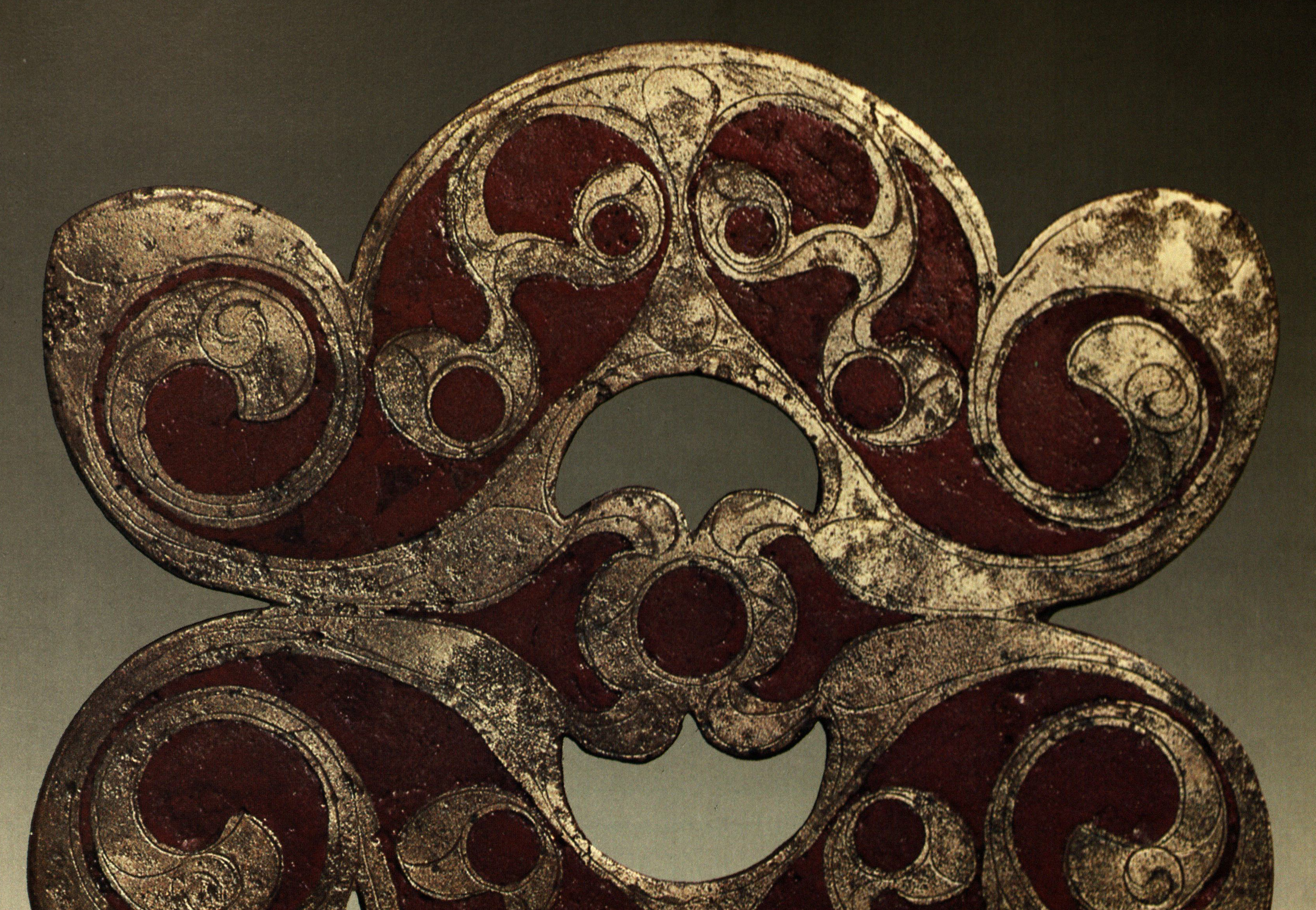
Ornamental bronze (Santon, Norfolk)

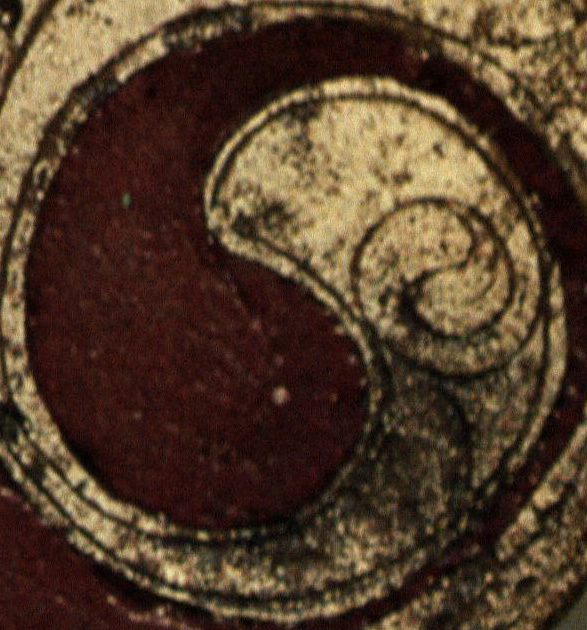
Bronze plaque (Santon, Norfolk) (detail)

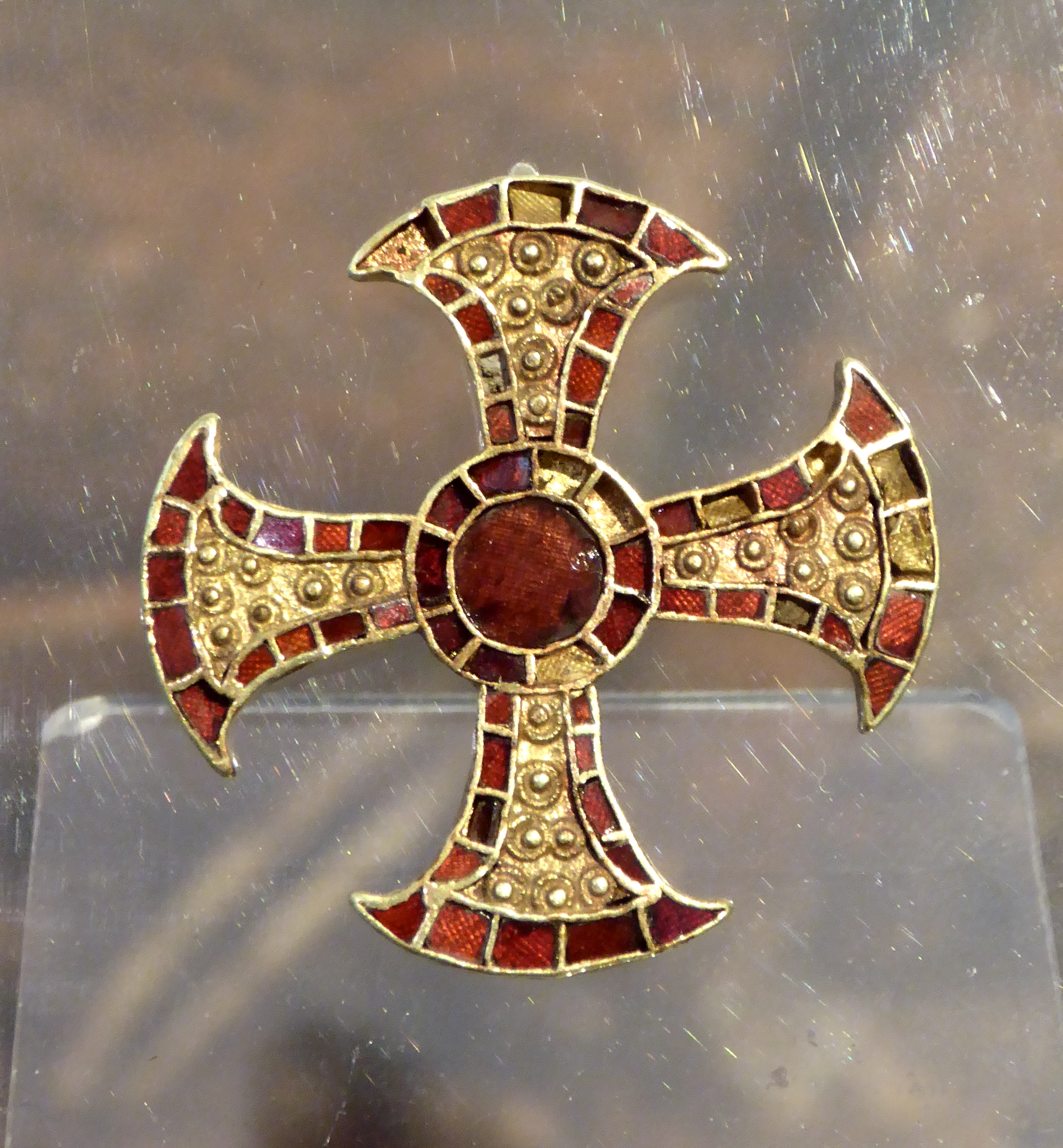
Pectoral cross from the Trumpington bed burial

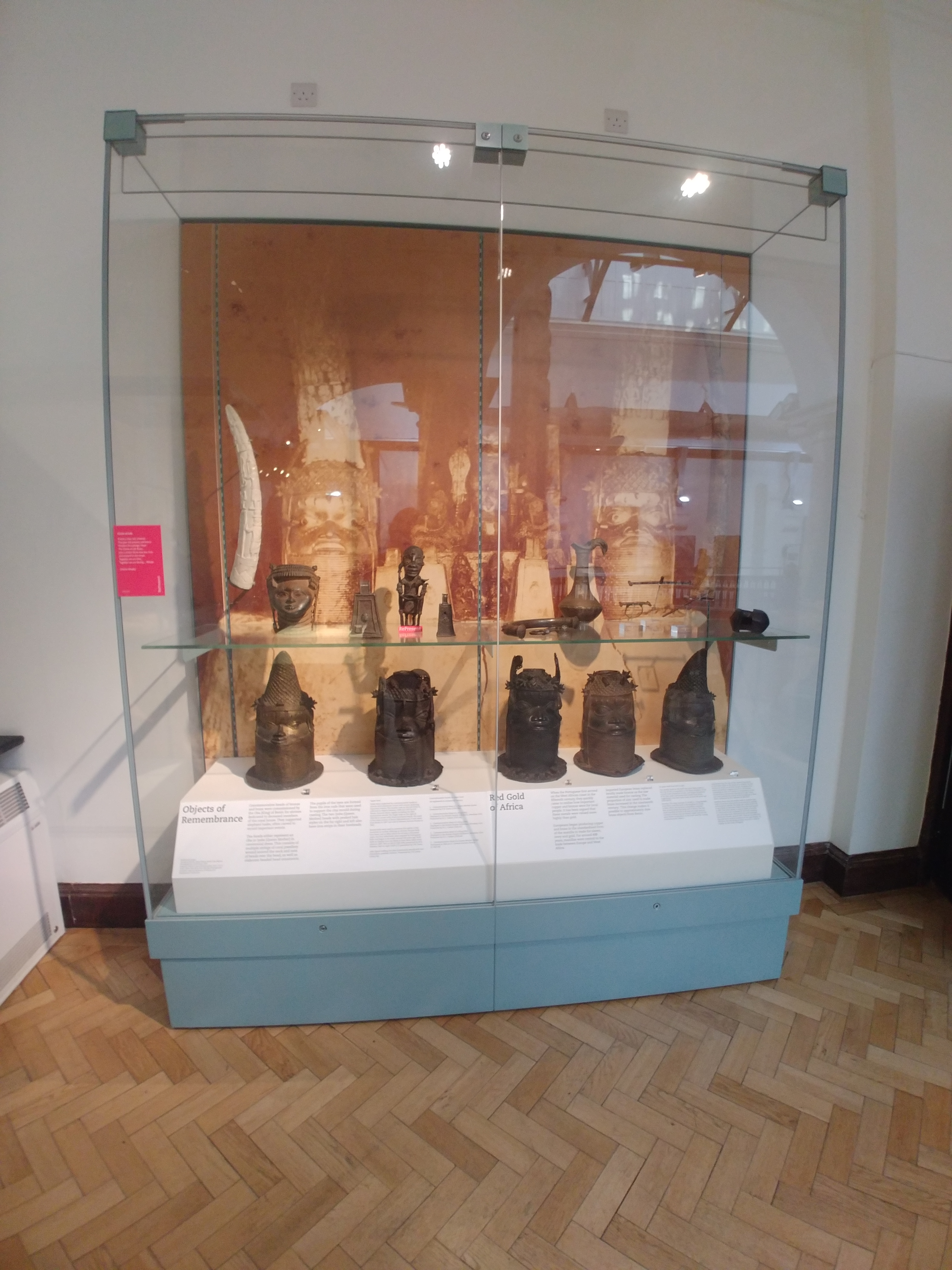
Display of Benin Bronzes

== See also ==
- Ugandan artefacts returned from Cambridge
