= Ugandan artefacts repatriated from Cambridge =

2024 return of Ugandan cultural artefacts

Thirty-nine Ugandan cultural artefacts were returned from the University of Cambridge to the Uganda Museum in Kampala in June 2024 as part of a programme to reposition and repatriate objects held in overseas collections. The objects were collected during the late nineteenth and early twentieth centuries, when Uganda was under British colonial rule, and were acquired by colonial administrators, missionaries, anthropologists, and soldiers. Many of the artefacts were taken from different regions of Uganda and later transferred to the Museum of Archaeology and Anthropology at the University of Cambridge, where they remained for over a century.

The return was presented as a step towards enabling Uganda to conserve, research, and display the artefacts within the country, and to allow for further study of their cultural and historical context. The objects were transferred under a three-year loan agreement for research and exhibition, with provisions for renewal and the possibility of a longer-term arrangement between the parties. The repatriation of the 39 artefacts followed earlier efforts to return Ugandan cultural objects, including the repatriation of the Kibuuka Regalia during Uganda's independence celebrations in 1962. The return is part of ongoing discussions about museum collection practices and the handling of cultural objects acquired during the colonial period.

== Returned artefacts ==
The collection includes objects acquired in the early twentieth century by the missionary and anthropologist John Roscoe, who conducted ethnographic work in Uganda and later deposited materials with the Museum of Archaeology and Anthropology. The items were collected from several kingdoms and communities, including Acholi, Buganda, Bunyoro, Ankole, Bukedi, Teso, Bugisu and Lango. These artefacts were acquired through a range of means, including confiscation, conversion-related acquisition, gifts, donations, purchases and other forms of transfer.

These artefacts include;

1. Royal Drum known as Mujjaguzo from Buganda
2. Six different types of Power objects locally known as Jjembe from Buganda
3. Drum dedicated to Dungu, god of the chase from Buganda
4. Spear shaft from Buganda
5. Clay tobacco pipe known as Emindi from Buganda
6. Clay vessel from Buganda.
7. The traditional formal dress of Muganda men known as Kanzu
8. A set of eight leather ngato (divination cards) from Buganda
9. Staff of office of the Katikiro of the Kingdom of Buganda known as Ddamulo
10. Six balongo, relics of the Kabakas of Buganda and a wooden knife, associated with the balongo
11. Wooden zither from Ankole
12. Four unusual ceramic milk bottles, decorated with white slip on black glaze from Ankole
13. Earthenware pot locally known as Ekyanzi from Ankole. This is a traditional wooden milk container used in parts of western Uganda, particularly among pastoral communities such as the Bahima people. It is typically carved from hardwood and used for storing, serving and sometimes fermenting milk, reflecting the cattle‑keeping heritage of these communities.
14. Headband of glass beads from Ankole was worn by priests of the god Wamala.
15. Angle Harp locally known as Ennanga from Bugisu
16. Two different types of Ornaments of human hair from Acholi
17. Headdress of human hair locally known as Etok from Acholi
18. Headdress of human hair From Lango
19. Two Acholi Spears from Teso and Bukedi
20. Ceramic milk bottle from Bunyoro
21. Royal drum of the Bunyoro
22. Shield known as Emomi from Bunyoro. This shield was made from hippopotamus hide.
23. Shield, of wood and cane from Bunyoro.This was designed in the style of the Buganda kingdom but made by craftspeople from the Bunyoro kingdom.
24. Royal meat dish from Bunyoro
