= Cronulla sand dunes =

Sand dunes in Sydney, New South Wales, Australia

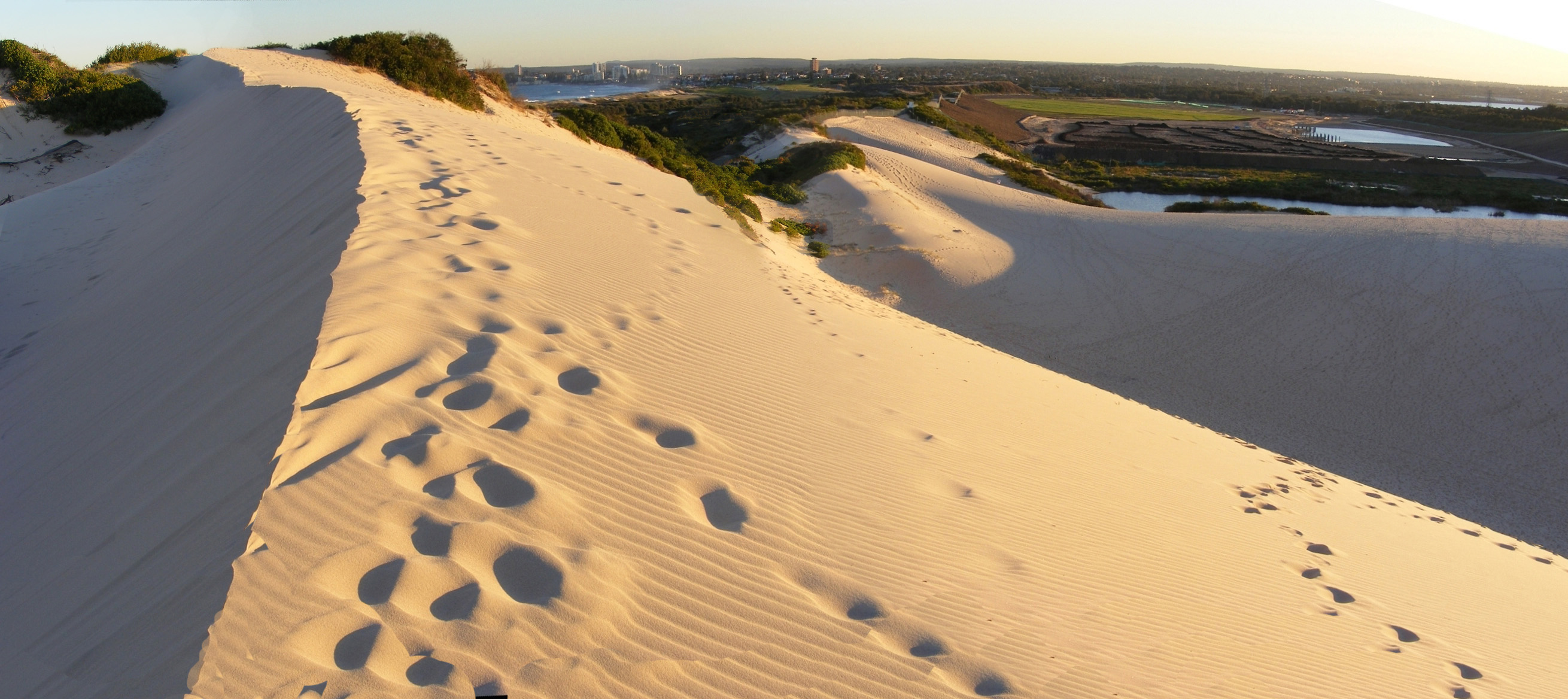
- The Cronulla sand dunes, pictured in 2007

- Location within east Sydney
- 34°02′07″S 151°10′28″E
- Location: Lindum Road, Kurnell, Sydney, New South Wales, Australia

New South Wales Heritage Register
- Official name: Cronulla Sand Dune and Wanda Beach Coastal Landscape; Part of Kurnell Peninsula Headland; Cronulla Sand Hill
- Type: State heritage (landscape)
- Designated: 26 September 2003
- Reference no.: 1668
- Type: Coastal environment
- Category: Landscape – Natural

The Cronulla sand dunes, also known officially as the Cronulla Sand Dune and Wanda Beach Coastal Landscape, are an open space, heritage-listed nature conservation, and visitor attraction located south of Sydney on the Kurnell Peninsula at Lindum Road, Kurnell, New South Wales, Australia. Formerly, it was a site for sand mining, film making, and had use as pastoral property. It is also known as part of Kurnell Peninsula Headland and Cronulla Sand Hill. It was added to the New South Wales State Heritage Register on 26 September 2003.

== History ==
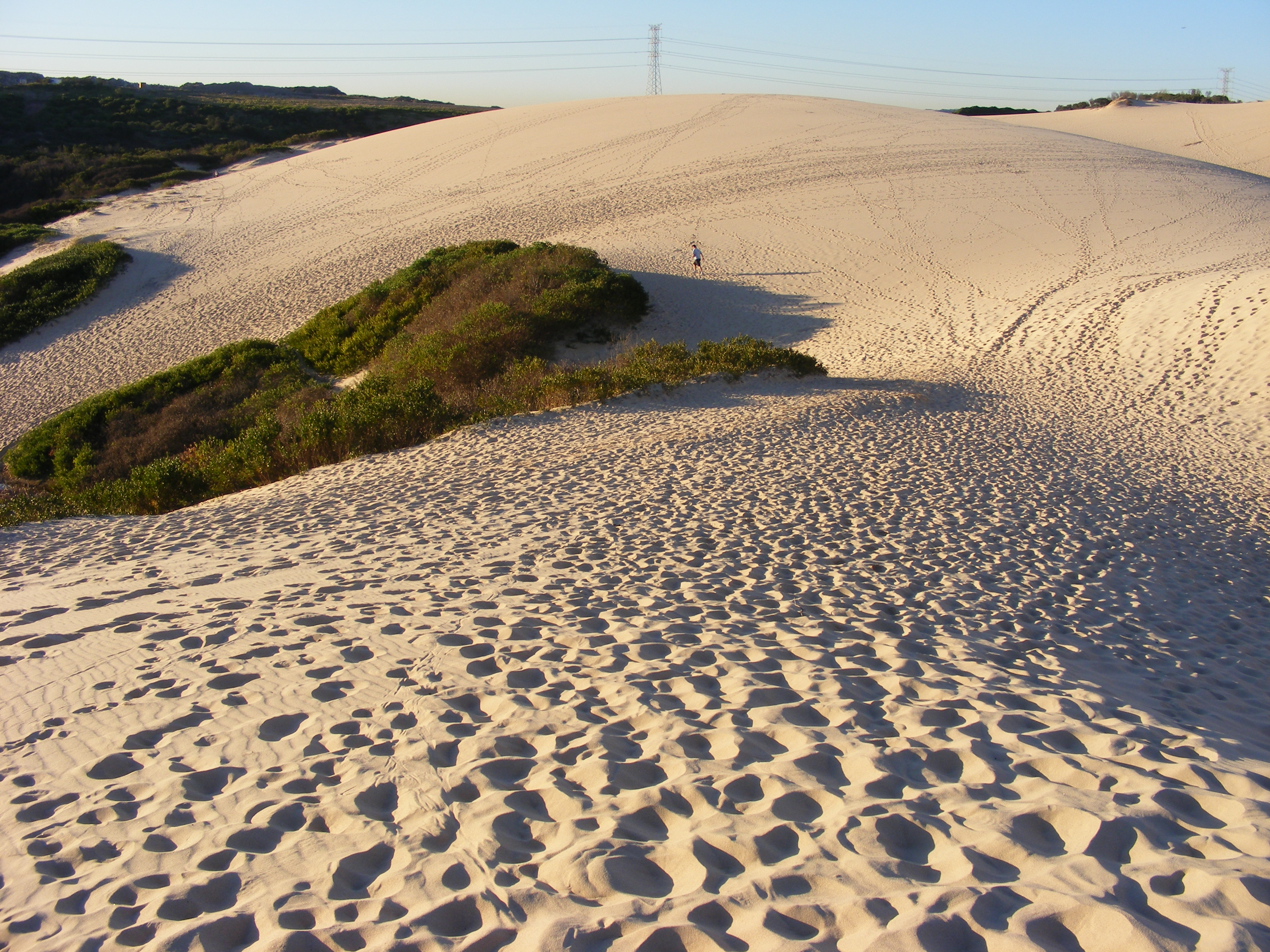

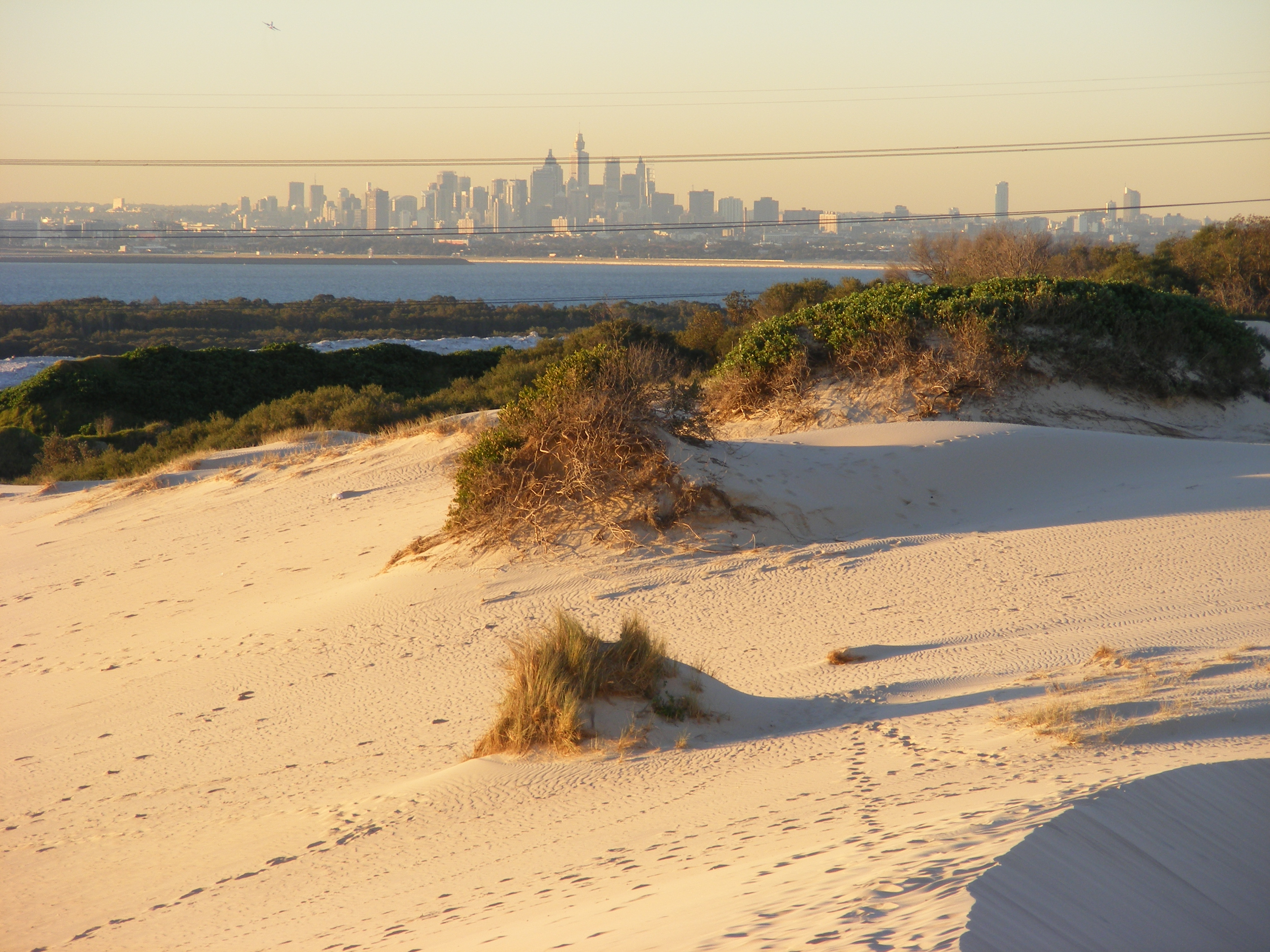
Cronulla dunes with the city of Sydney in view

The sand dune system which is also referred to as the Kurnell sand dune is estimated to be about 15,000 years old. It was formed when the sea reached its present level and began to stabilise, between 9000 and 6000 BCE. The Georges and Cooks rivers flowed to the south-east beneath the present sand dune system near Wanda and joined the ocean at Bate Bay. This resulted in the isolation of Kurnell which was an island from the mainland. The rivers eventually became blocked with accumulating sand and sediment as the sea level rose. As the rivers gradually silted up they were forced into changing their course and were led out to sea via La Perouse rather than continue to maintain an opening in an ever-growing sand barrier near Wanda. This resulted in a tombolo being formed and joined Kurnell with the Cronulla mainland. The deepest part of the ancient river channel now lies 100 metres (330 ft) below the surface at the southern end of the peninsula, near Wanda Beach.

=== Aboriginal culture ===
The sand hills of Kurnell possess historical, cultural, scientific and natural significance as a place of early European contact with the Gweagal people. The site has significant Aboriginal signs of habitation, from carvings, ceremonial sites, middens and sites of flaked sharpening stones. The site is of significant interest to the Aboriginal community, as many of the other hills and dunes that were inhabited by their ancestors have now disappeared. As the dunes move or drift, most of the sites once occupied by the Aboriginal people have been covered and preserved.

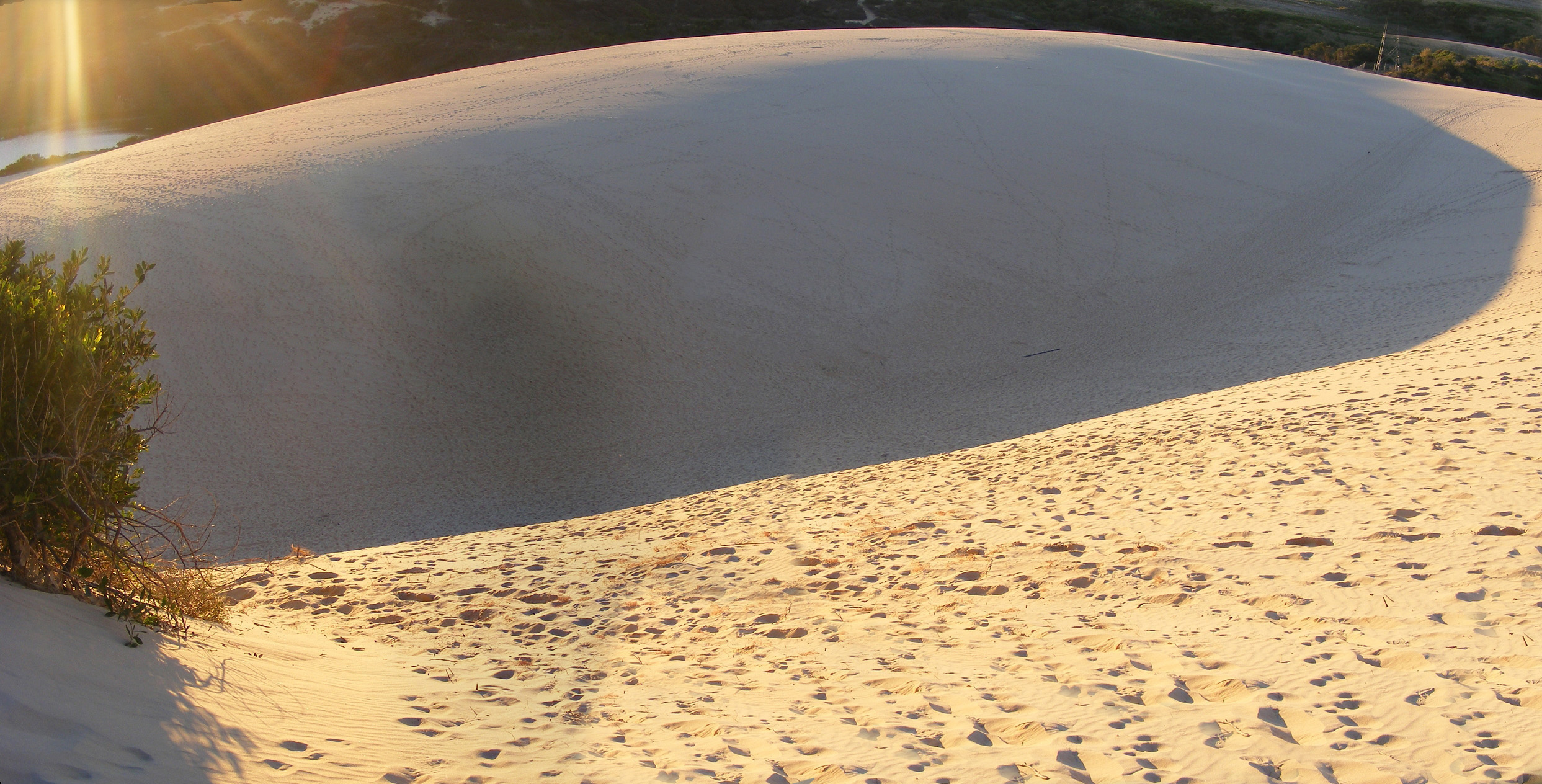

The original inhabitants on the Kurnell Peninsula were the Gweagal people, a clan of the Tharawal (or Dharawal) tribe who occupied the region for thousands of years. Their tribe spanned the areas between the Cooks and Georges Rivers from the shores of Botany Bay and westwards towards Liverpool. According to a Gweagal elder, "Dharawal is similar to a state and Gweagal is similar to a shire within the state, Cunnel (Kurnell) is a family village within the shire". A clan consisted of approximately 20 to 50 people who lived in their own territory. They had no written language and each tribe had its own dialect. They knew how to light fires long before the arrival of white man. Their clothing consisted of a woven hair sash in which they used to carry tools and weapons and sometimes the optional possum-skin coat for the winter season. The Gweagal were the northernmost people of the Dharawal nation. They fished from canoes or from the shore using barbed spears and fishing lines with hooks in and around Botany Bay and the Georges River. Waterfowl could be caught in the swamplands (Towra Point), and the variety of soils would have supported a variety of edible and medicinal plants. Birds and their eggs, possums, wallabies and goannas were also a part of their staple diet, in which they made fur coats and ceremonial attire. The abundance of fish and other foodstuffs in these heavily timbered waterways meant that these natives were less nomadic than those of Outback Australia. The various middens, rock carvings and paintings in the area confirm this.

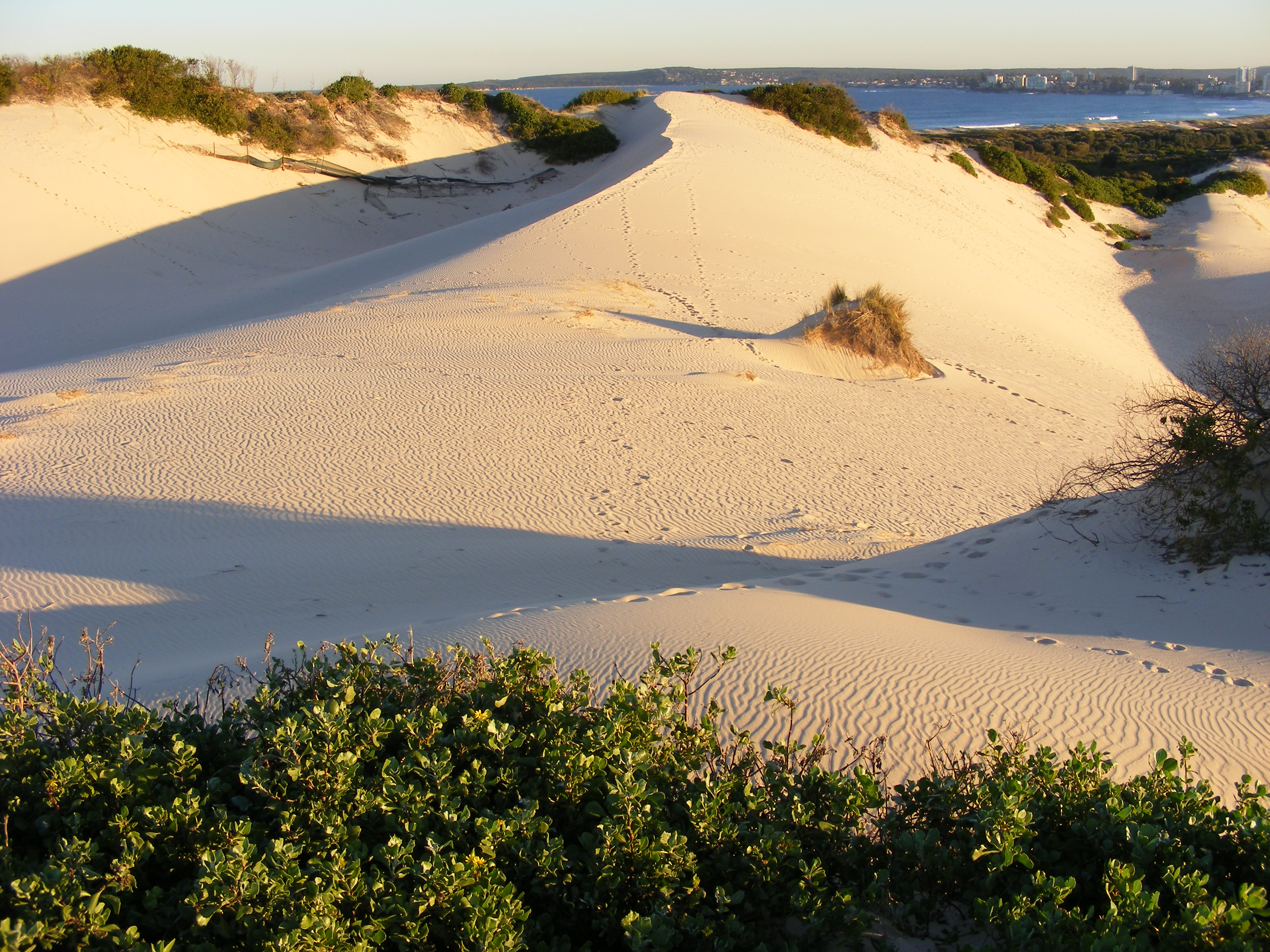

The Gweagal were the guardians of the sacred white clay pits in their territory. Members of the tribe walked hundreds of miles to collect the clay, as it was considered sacred amongst the indigenous locals and had many uses. They used it to line the base of their canoes so they could light fires, and also as a white body paint, (as witnessed by Captain James Cook). Colour was added to the clay using berries, which produced a brightly coloured paint that was used in ceremonies. It was also eaten as a medicine, an antacid. Geebungs and other local berries were mixed in the clay and it was eaten as a dietary supplement with zinc. Today members of the Tharawal people still live near the Cronulla sand dunes and participate in their traditional Aboriginal art and culture.

=== European settlement ===
On 29 April 1770, Captain James Cook of HM Bark Endeavour, anchored in Botany Bay, stepping ashore near Silver Beach. Shortly after, James Cook looked down from the nearby at what is now known as Cronulla Beach. The high ground that he stood on was completely covered in vegetation & stands of tall trees, so Cook made no mention of sand dunes during his visit to the Kurnell peninsula & Botany Bay. HM ship 'Endeavour' stayed in the bay for eight days, during which botanists Joseph Banks & Daniel Solander collected botanical specimens while Cook's officers mapped the area and tried (unsuccessfully) to make contact with the indigenous population. One of the artefacts that was picked up by the British after an affray was the Gweagal shield, now held by the British Museum. When Cook reported back to England he said that the land was eminently suitable for agriculture, it had good soil, some of it sandy, and the area was lightly wooded. Captain Arthur Phillip, arriving with the First Fleet, stepped ashore on 18 January 1788, after following Cook's advice. They began to clear land and dig wells, but a week later decided to abandon the site and sail north to Port Jackson.

Less than 100 years after Cook's landing, most of the original vegetation had been cleared and burnt, larger trees had been ring barked or simply cut down. Thomas Holt who was one of the first land owners (at one time he also owned most of what is today the Sutherland Shire), planned to use the dunes for farming sheep; this industry failed outright. To promote grass growth he destroyed as many of the oldest trees as was viable and to his dismay all that regrew was dense impenetrable thorny scrub. By 1868 the forests of blackbutt and ironbark were cut down for houses and bridge construction whilst the remaining vegetation was cleared for grazing.

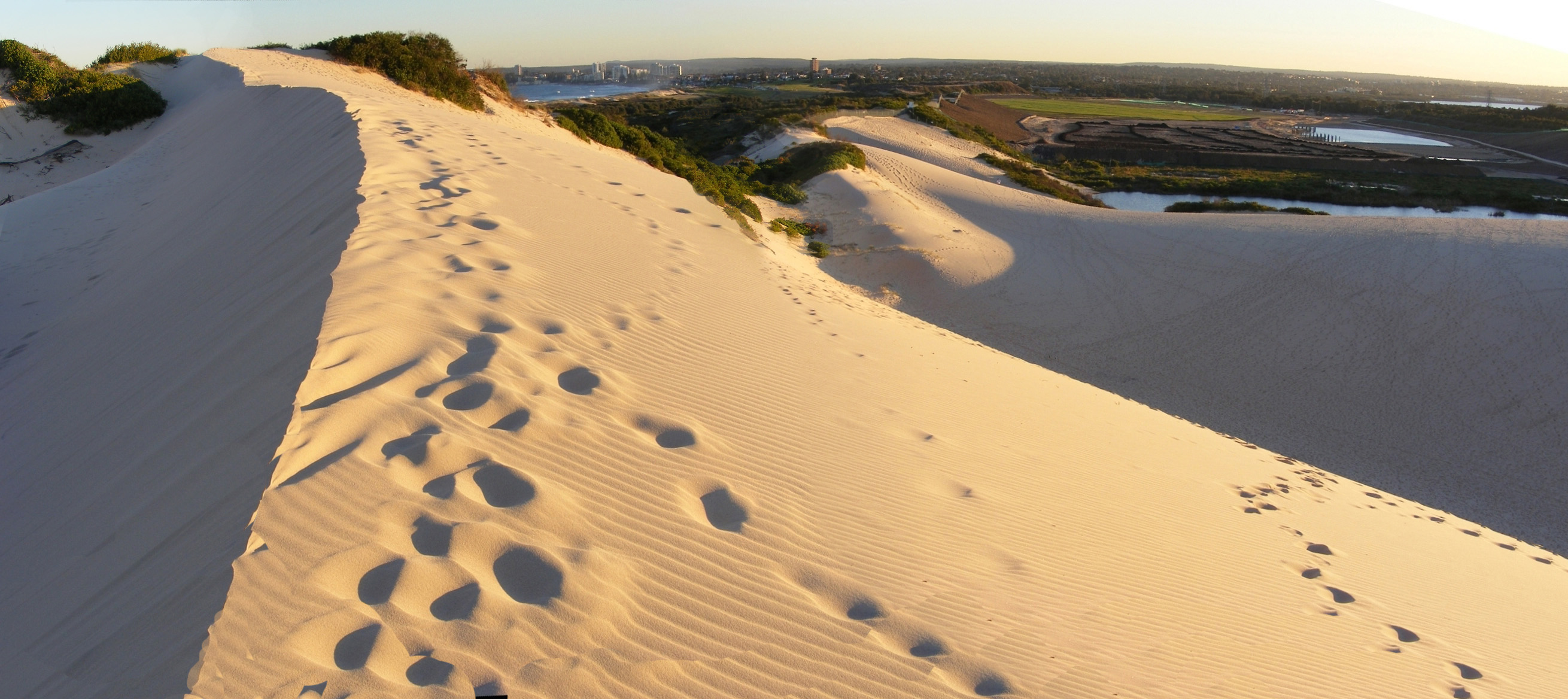
Looking over the dunes, south towards Cronulla

The first land grant was issued in 1815 when a whaler and merchant by the name of James Birnie, was given 280 hectares (700 acres) of land and 65 hectares (160 acres) of saltwater marshes on the Kurnell Peninsula. The grant included Captain Cook's landing place. He called it ‘Alpha Farm’, and built himself a cottage there. In 1801 John Connell, an ironmonger, arrived in Sydney as a free settler. In 1821 Connell was granted 400 hectares (1,000 acres) at Quibray Bay next to Birnie's grant. When James Birnie was declared insane in 1828 John Connell gained possession of his property. John Connell now had full ownership of the Kurnell Peninsula. Connell erected a new house, which he named ‘Alpha House,’ built on the foundations of Birnie's original cottage.

James Connell and his two grandsons, Elias and John Laycock, were the first land owners to log the peninsula. They began to harvest timber from the estate in 1835. In the 1840s a canal from Woolooware Bay was built so that logs could be floated into Botany Bay, loaded onto ships and sailed up to Sydney. When John Connell died in 1848, he left his estate to his two grandsons. The first Crown land auctions in the area took place in 1856. It was here that John Connell Laycock bought another 280 hectares (700 acres). This increased the size of the estate to 1,800 hectares (4,500 acres).

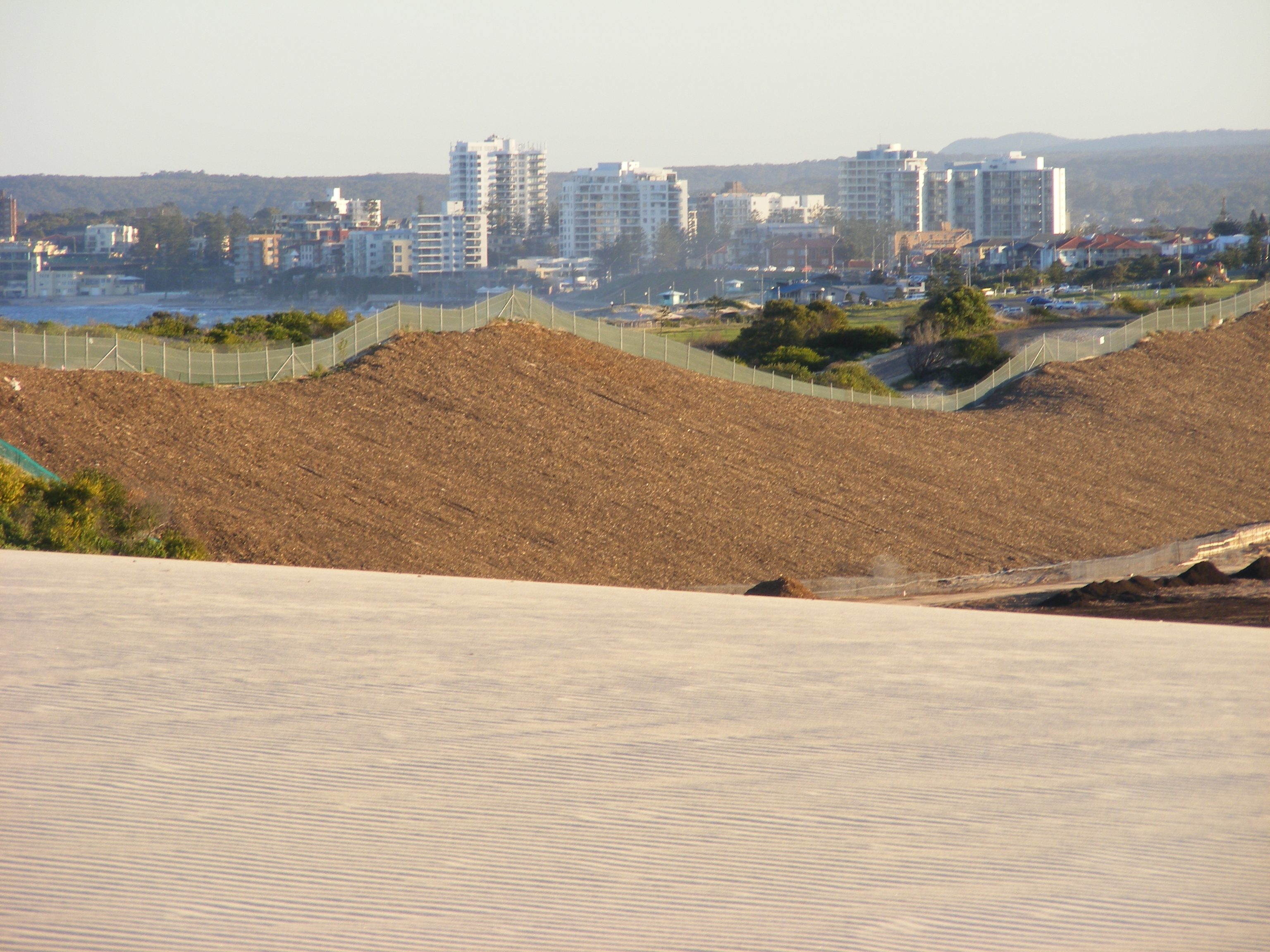
Looking south at Cronulla from the dunes

Holt purchased Laycock's entire estate on the peninsula in 1861 for A£3,275. Holt, originally from Yorkshire, sailed into Sydney some time in 1842. He made his fortune during the gold rushes of the early 1850s. Holt first settled at Liverpool; he then moved to Sutherland and further increased the size of his property to approximately 5,300 hectares (13,000 acres). He erected several mansions, ran his ‘Sutherland Estate’ in the English manner, and travelled into Sydney to manage his business affairs. In 1868, Holt's land was still mostly uncleared virgin bushland. After Holt had cleared most of the timber, he began to plant grass seeds imported from Germany. The Sutherland estate was divided into eleven portions. It was then divided into 60 smaller paddocks using Brushwood fencing. The fence posts used to divide these lots can still be found in Towra Point, which is also part of the Kurnell Peninsula.

Holt attempted grazing, first with sheep which had to be destroyed when they became infected with footrot, and then with cattle. The land on his estate was not suited for intensive grazing, so after most of the trees were felled, herds of cattle then removed the stabilizing grass cover and exposed the sand dunes underneath. Large expanses of sand had been exposed along the coastline. The dune system that covers an area of 400 hectares (1,000 acres), measuring 40 metres (130 ft) above and 90 metres (300 ft) below sea level, became unstable and began to move north at a rate of eight metres (twenty-six feet) a year. Land clearing and cattle grazing resulted in a degraded landscape, but created the distinctive Cronulla sand dunes of today.

=== Development of the area since the mid-1880s ===
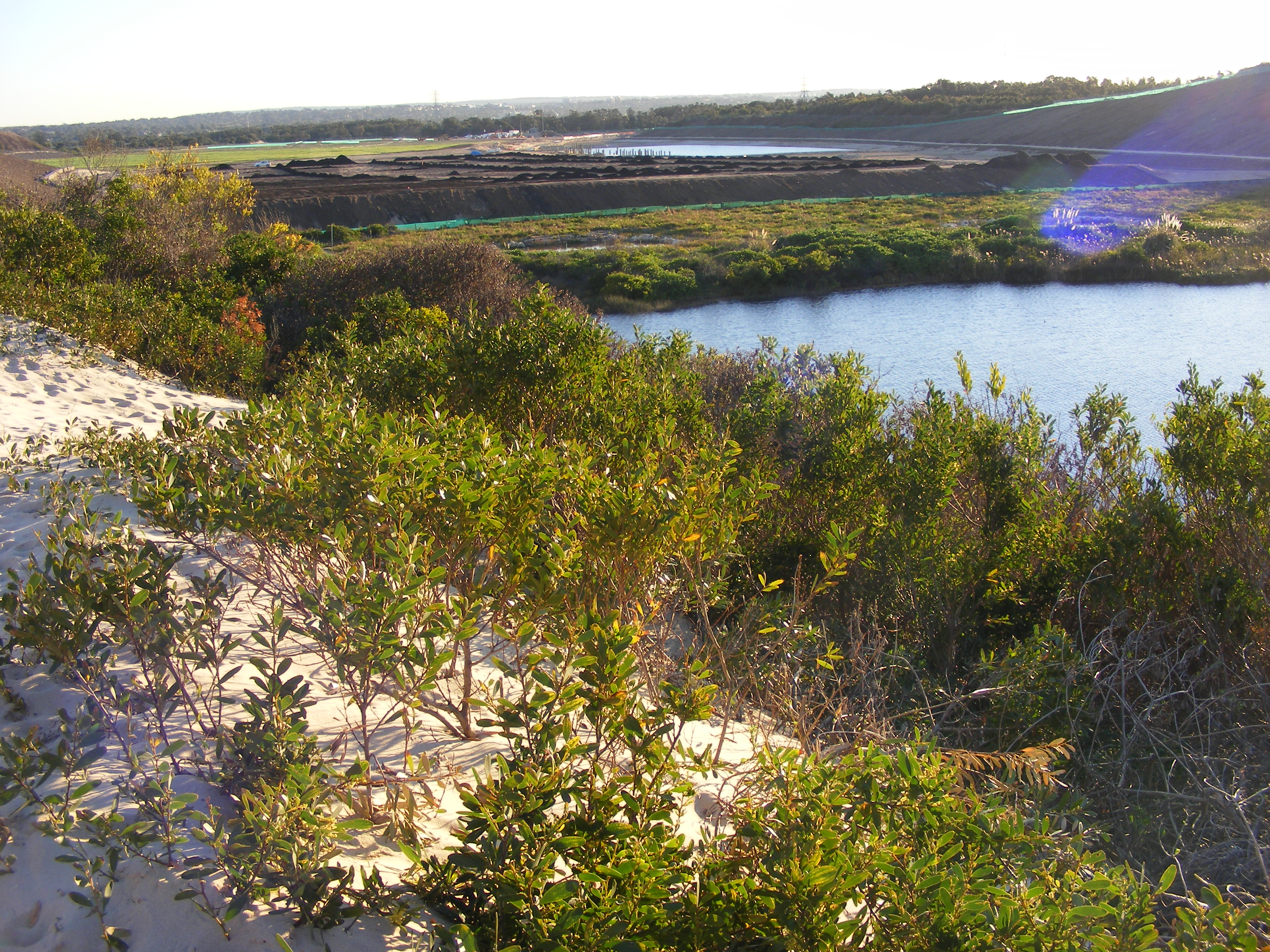

In December 1885 the Illawarra train line was extended from Oatley to Sutherland . It was further extended to Waterfall in 1886, and finally to Kiama in 1888. The area began to attract visitors and day-trippers from Sydney. Popular destinations were Oatley, Como and Waterfall. Horse-drawn coaches began to travel the distance between the railhead at Sutherland to Cronulla on the coast, and in 1911 a steam tram service began operation. Another point of access by road was via the Taren Point ferry. This opened up the area to seaside holiday-makers. By the 1920s Cronulla had become famous for its surf beaches with uninterrupted golden sand which stretched for five kilometres (3.1 miles) along the coast and the bare dunes became synonymous with Cronulla.

Between 1920 and 1930 the sand hills were acknowledged to be a deserted and desecrated landscape, and their economic value was minimal. Though desolate, the large expanses of sand became a popular playground for generations of children n for activities such as sandboarding.

In 1933 Sutherland Shire Council declined an offer to set aside 1,800 hectares (4,500 acres) between the Cronulla Golf Club and Kurnell as a reserve. In 1937 it declined another offer to buy 290 hectares (720 acres) of sand hills. In the 1930s the Holt family began to remove sand for use in the building industry.

The desert-like scenery has attracted many filmmakers. In the late 1930s, the Charles Chauvel movie Forty Thousand Horsemen was filmed in the sand hills. Chauvel also used the site as a backdrop for The Rats of Tobruk (1944); more recently significant scenes from Mad Max Beyond Thunderdome (1985) by George Miller & George Oglivie were shot there.

On 11 January 1965, the bodies of two 15-year-old girls, Marianne Schmidt and Christine Sharrock, were found in the sand hills just off of Wanda Beach. They had been beaten, stabbed and sexually assaulted after death. Despite an extensive police investigation, the killer has never been identified and the case remains one of Australia's most notorious unsolved crimes, known as the Wanda Beach Murders.

=== Sand mining ===
In 1933 the Sutherland Shire Council asked the Government to set aside the 810 hectares (2,000 acres) between Cronulla Golf Club and Kurnell as a reserve. In April 1937, Haymarket Land and Building Co. offered Sutherland Shire Council 290 hectares (720 acres) of land near the entrance to Kurnell for eight pounds per acre. Most of the councillors wanted to declare the site a National Park. They wanted it to be titled "the Birthplace of Australian History and Gateway to Captain Cooks Landing Place." The dunes at Towra Point were to be included in this park. The council was evenly split, but Joe Monro, the council's President [now referred to as the Mayor], argued that because the site "was nothing but sand it was completely useless". He decided to vote against the purchase. The sandhills were doomed from that point. The Government couldn't see any reason to establish another National Reserve so near to Captain Cooks Landing Place Reserve.

In the 1930s the Holt family began its sand mining operations to supply the expanding Sydney building market and continued until 1990 with an estimate of over 70 million tonnes of sand being removed. The sand has been valued for many decades by the Sydney building industry, mainly because of its high crushed shell content and lack of organic matter. The site has now been reduced to a few remnant dunes and deep water-filled pits which are now being filled with demolition waste from Sydney's building sites. Removal of the sand has significantly weakened the peninsula's capacity to resist storms. Ocean waves pounding against the reduced Kurnell dune system have threatened to break through into Botany Bay, especially during the storms of May and June 1974 and August, 1998.

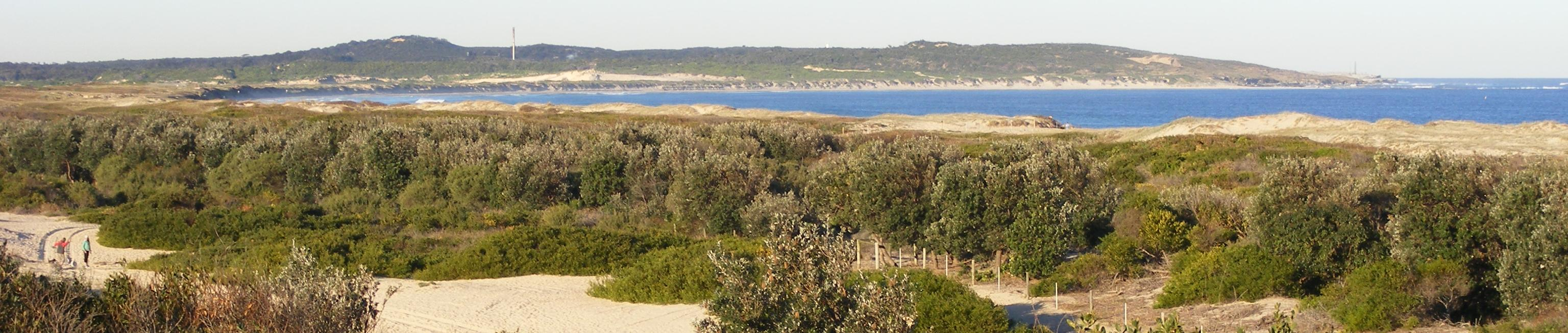
Looking north over the Kurnell Peninsula

=== Caltex oil refinery ===
In 1951 Caltex Oil Company first approached Sutherland Shire Council to build a new oil refinery at Kurnell. It required a site of 160 hectares (400 acres) and initially the Council rejected the proposal. The issues sparked a series of protests from environmental groups and those concerned that the refinery would despoil the Captain Cook Landing Place Reserve. Shortly after, however, the Council withdrew its objection, and what became known as the Australian Oil Refinery Company, a subsidiary of Caltex, opened in 1954. At the same time, the Sutherland Shire Council built Captain Cook Drive to service the refinery. The refinery ceased operation in October 2014.

The Australian Oil Refinery Company remains the largest single industry on the Peninsula. The Holt Group (owned by the descendants of Thomas Holt) continues to be a major landholder, but large sections of the Peninsula have been progressively sold off to other private interests and, since the 1950s, the area has been heavily industrialised. The removal of sand from the dunes began in the 1930s, but following the post-war building boom, it has been estimated that in excess of 70 million tonnes of sand have been removed. The Australian Oil Refinery, once obscured by towering dunes, is now visible from Cronulla, and a fraction of the original dunes remain.

=== Further development ===
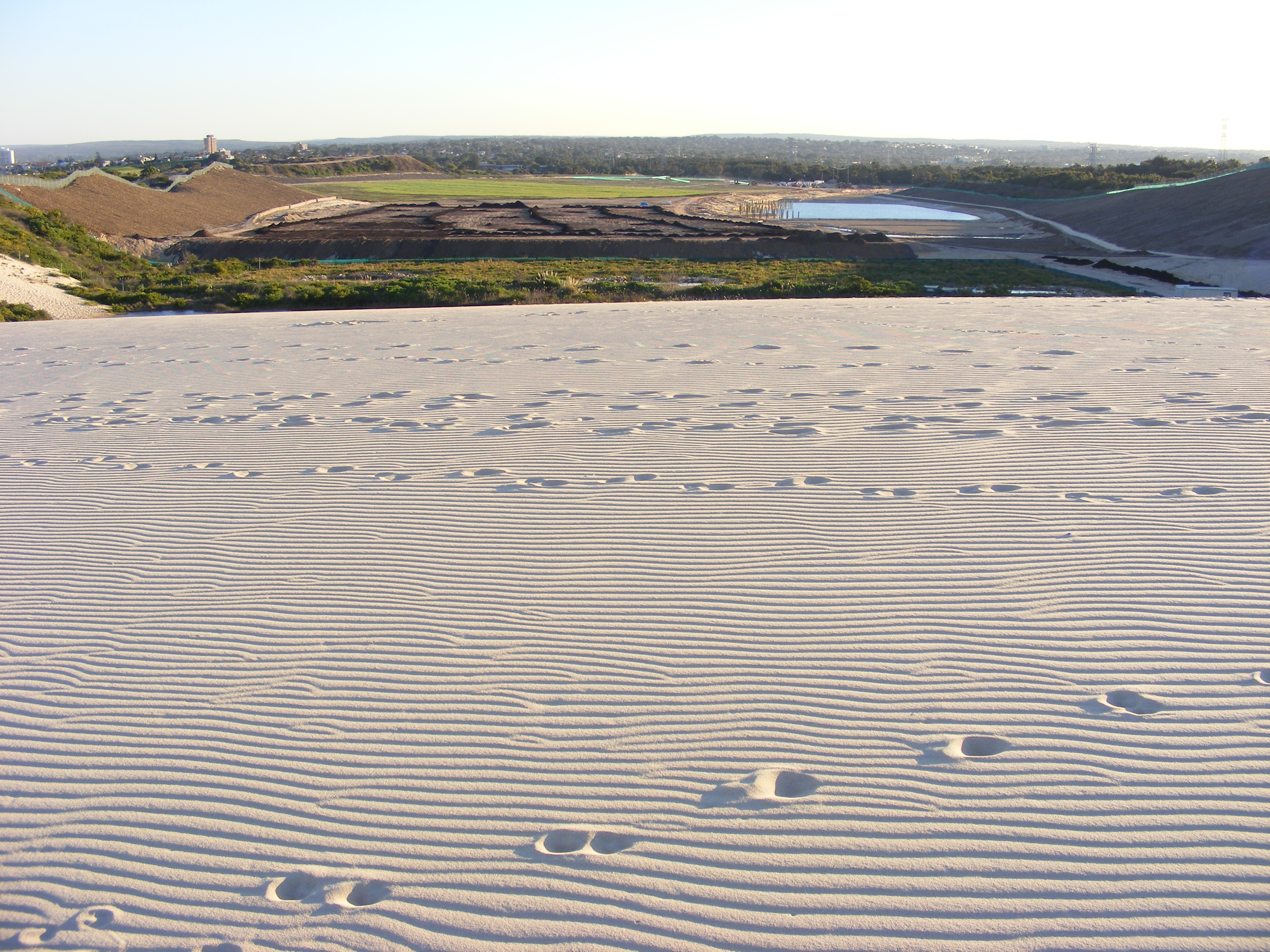
Looking south with the Australand construction zone in view

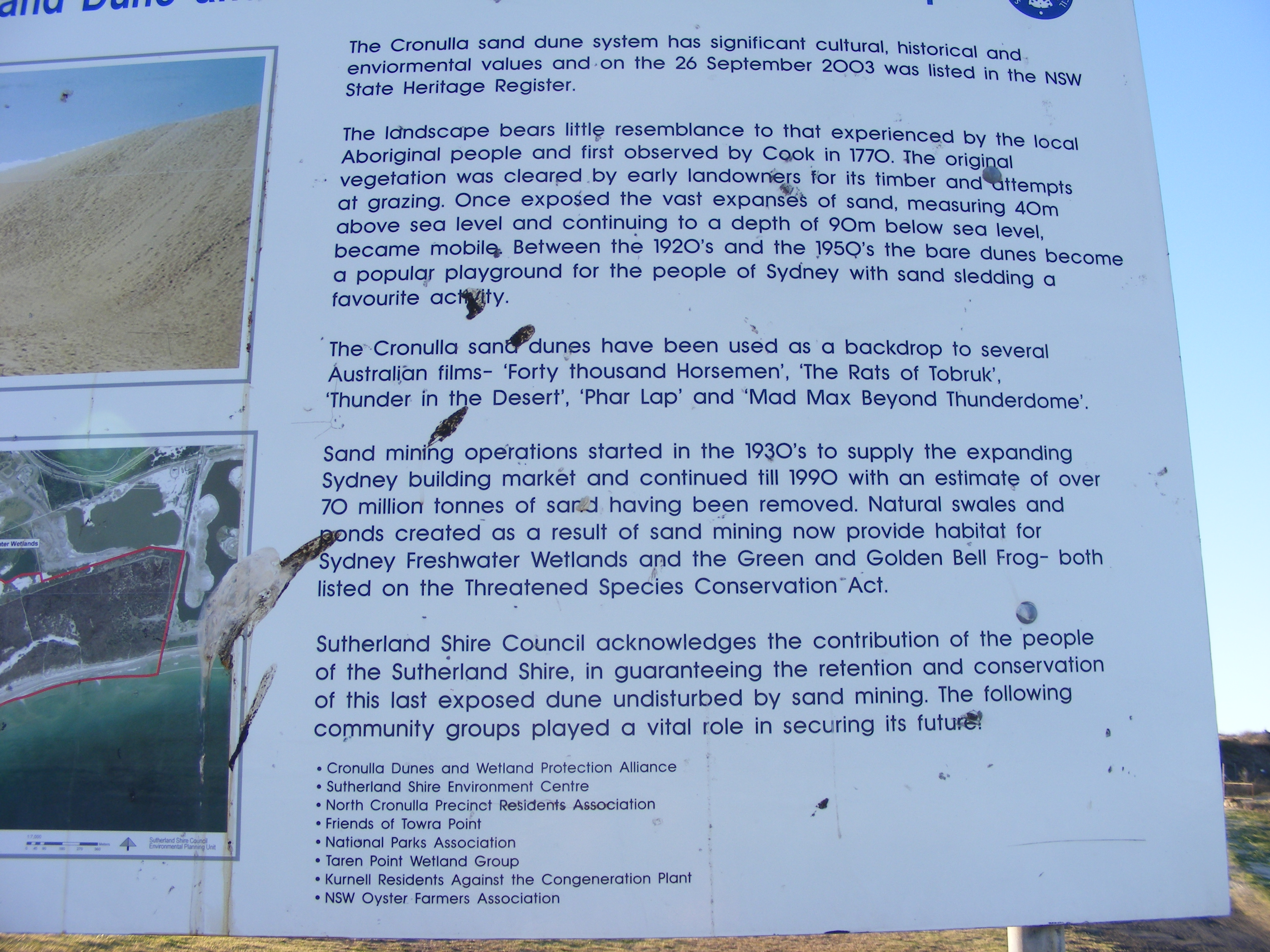
A sign at the start of the walking track leading into the duned area

Industrialisation of the Kurnell Peninsula continues to be an ongoing problem amongst community groups and environmentalists. Plans for further development at the site has been cause for continual public protest between developers, locals and environmental groups. A proposal to build a chemical plant by the German pharmaceutical company, Bayer in 1986 resulted in public protests, environmental objections and a Commission of Inquiry, chaired by John Woodward. The plan never went ahead on the grounds of both environmental and economic issues.

In 2004 a major housing development at the Kurnell site just north of Wanda Beach was cleared by the Land and Environment Court after developer Australand appealed Council's rejection of the plan. The court has allowed building on one-third of the 62-hectare site, "subject to conditions such as safeguarding the environment.

Sutherland Shire Council's objections included issues such as the impact on the threatened green and golden bell frog and concerns about two key ecosystem impacts on the sandhills and the freshwater wetland area. The court's commissioners rejected Sutherland Shire's case, ruling in favour of the Australand development. The court also accepted that the Wanda sand hills had to be revegetated to stop the sand from filling up ponds and swallowing up the vegetation in the area. The council spent $650,000 on the case and wanted the area set aside for tourism, environmental conservation and heritage.

In 2010, after two and a half years of negotiations, approval was granted for the rezoning of 130 hectares (320 acres) of land owned by Australand and Breen Holdings for a major residential housing subdivision of around 420 single dwellings and recreation / sporting areas to include ten community-owned playing fields, a skate park and other facilities worth up to $25 million plus an additional 49 hectares (120 acres) of public open space on top of the existing 42 hectares (100 acres) already committed as open space. Treated water is to be diverted from the nearby sewerage treatment plant to be used for toilet flushing and garden irrigation for all homes in the subdivision and to irrigate the ten new playing fields on the site.

=== Conservation history ===
The Kurnell Peninsula has been the subject of a number of Commission of Inquiries through the 1970s and 1980s. The most recent Commission of Inquiry in 1986 by Commissioner Woodward led to the re-zoning of the Australand site to permit non-residential uses, including tourist facilities, serviced apartments, commercial, recreational and light industrial uses. The area had been subject to sand extraction since the 1950s and the only portion of the land not subject to sand removal was the H2 dune, which is the high dune to the north-east of the site. Its protection as a surviving remnant of the former Cronulla dunes was recommended along with an Interim Conservation Order under the Heritage Act. In 1990 Australand bought Lot 113, DP 777967 from Breen Holdings and the Hooker Corporation. Sand removal ceased in 1990 and the area has been vacant since and remains largely denuded.

One effect of recent sand extraction on the site has been the creation of a number of artificial ponds or waste dumps which have filled with water. In a number of these, the endangered Green and Golden Bell Frog has established itself and these ponds are now important breeding grounds. In 1996 the Cronulla Dunes and Wetlands Protection Alliance nominated the dune for protection under the Heritage Act.

The Aboriginal community holds a strong interest in the remaining undisturbed sand dune. The action of the shifting sand has the potential to capture objects, and all traces of Aboriginal objects are necessarily destroyed by sand removal. Therefore, the H2 dune has high potential to reveal archaeological evidence of former Aboriginal occupation such as middens, flaked sharpening stones, carvings and ceremonial sites.

The Cronulla Sand Dune and adjacent Lucas Reserve and Wanda Beach demonstrate a high level of intactness in terms the modified dunal landscape as it was created following late nineteenth-century grazing activities. They form an intact remnant of historical landscape that no longer exists. The long term conservation of the dunal system and in particular the unvegetated mobile sand dune may require stabilisation and revegetation works.

== Heritage listing ==
As at 29 January 2003, the Cronulla Sand Dune, Lucas Reserve and Wanda Beach as a landscape were of historical and contemporary cultural significance to the Aboriginal community. The dune landscape possesses historic, scientific, cultural and natural significance as a site of early European contact with Aborigines, a place of environmental transformation as a result of European agricultural practices, habitat for the endangered Green and Golden Bell Frog within a modified environment, and a location for significant Australian films. The dune and Wanda Beach possess social significance as a place of recreation and tourism since the late nineteenth century and community activism to protect the dune from sand mining in the later part of the twentieth century. As the last major exposed dune in a landscape degraded by 70 years of sand mining it has landmark and aesthetic qualities that are held in high esteem by the community.

Cronulla Sand Dune and Wanda Beach Coastal Landscape was listed on the New South Wales State Heritage Register on 26 September 2003, with the justification that "the dune landscape possesses historic, scientific, cultural and natural significance as a site of early European contact with Aborigines, a place of environmental transformation as a result of European agricultural practices, habitat for the endangered Green and Golden Bell Frog within a modified environment, and a location for significant Australian films."

The site has historic and cultural significance for the Aboriginal community. The Kurnell Peninsula is well known as the place where Captain James Cook first landed on Australian soil in April 1770. It is also the site of first contact between the English and Aboriginal people in NSW. In 1788 it was briefly the site of Captain Arthur Phillip's first settlement until the First Fleet relocated to Port Jackson. As such, the whole peninsula has acquired a special historical and iconic status in the history of European settlement in Australia and the history of contact between the English and Aboriginal communities. The landscape today bears little resemblance to that experienced by local Aboriginal people and first observed by Cook in 1770. What was a predominantly vegetated and lightly wooded landscape has been heavily modified as a result of European agricultural practices. In the late nineteenth century the dunes became popular with tourists from Sydney. This period is associated with the opening of the railway. Between the 1920s and the 1950s Cronulla became a popular holiday destination famed for its beaches and sand dunes. The use of the dunes for recreation has continued to the present day. The Cronulla sand dunes have been used as a location for major Australian Films. The sheer expanse of the dunes was effectively used to convey remote desert regions in films such as the epic 1941 Charles Chauvel film Forty Thousand Horsemen which starred Chips Rafferty. The film detailed the battles of the Australian Light Horse regiment in Palestine during World War 1. A number of local residents worked as extras in the film. The Rats of Tobruk, Thunder in the Desert, Phar Lap and Mad Max Beyond Thunderdome also utilised the dunes as a location. Sand removal began in the 1930s, but accelerated from the 1950s onwards to supply sand for the Sydney building market. Sand removal has essentially evacuated the once prominent dunal system from the landscape. The Cronulla Sand Dune above Wanda Beach survives as the last major exposed dune (undisturbed by sand removal) along the coastal strip and, together with the adjacent Lucas Reserve and Wanda Beach, serves to demonstrate the historical, environmental and cultural transformations of the area over the last two hundred years.

The place has a strong or special association with a person, or group of persons, of importance of cultural or natural history of New South Wales's history.

The site has historic and cultural significance for the Aboriginal community. The Kurnell Peninsula has a strong association with John Connell Laycock (1818 - 1897). Laycock grew up on the Kurnell Peninsula, his free settler grandfather and guardian having acquired almost the entire Peninsula by 1838. The family was actively involved in timber getting, transporting ironbark, turpentine, blackbutt, mahogany and red cedar to Sydney by ship. Laycock, with his brother, eventually inherited these lands and secured further property in the Sutherland district, eventually amassing 1,800 hectares (4,500 acres). Laycock was a Member of the Legislative Assembly for Central Cumberland (1859-1864) and Clarence (1864 - 1866). Laycock also held the title of Quarantine Keeper at Bradley's Head (1878 - 1884). The destruction by fire of his Prince of Wales Theatre and adjoining properties forced Laycock to sell his heavily mortgaged properties to his friend and fellow member of the Legislative Assembly, Thomas Holt.

The Kurnell Peninsula has strong associations with the Holt family, and in particular Thomas Holt (1811-1888) who acquired the Peninsula in 1861 from John Connell Laycock and began the program of clear felling and grazing that so dramatically altered the landscape. A successful wool buyer and property speculator, Holt acquired over 1.21m hectares of land in NSW and Queensland between 1851 and 1880, making him one of the wealthiest men in the colony. During the 1860s Holt consolidated his landholdings on the Peninsula (which included Captain Cook's landing place). His accumulated holdings represented 5,261 hectares (13,000 acres) of what is the present day Sutherland Shire. Holt built several fine homes in Sydney including "The Warren" in Marrickville and "Sutherland House" in Sylvania (built 1871, destroyed 1918). Holt was a Member of the first NSW Legislative Assembly in 1856 and its first Treasurer June - August 1856). Holt was the Member for Newtown (July 1861 - November 1864) and a Member of the Legislative Council (1868 - 1883). Holt is notable for employing Aboriginals on his Sutherland Estate and for establishing the oyster industry at Kurnell and introducing Buffalo grass to Australia to control sand dune degradation. The Holt family continues to own land on the Kurnell Peninsula via a number of incorporated companies (the Holt Group).

The place is important in demonstrating aesthetic characteristics and/or a high degree of creative or technical achievement in New South Wales.

The site has historic and cultural significance for the Aboriginal community. The Cronulla Sand Dune is aesthetically distinctive and is a landmark at both the Local and State levels. From the 1870s the sand dunes at Kurnell were one of the most visible features of the landscape of Botany Bay, recurring in almost all of the panoramas from important view points. They were visible from many parts of Sydney and at one stage the Blue Mountains. The exposed dunal system became a landmark of note for nineteenth-century day-trippers from Sydney who would take the ferry service from La Perouse to Kurnell Bay to see Cook's landing place, the dunes and Cronulla beaches. The dunes, some of which rose to 44 metres in height, and Cronulla Beach were a popular tourist attraction between the 1920s and 1950s when Cronulla was a resort town. The height and sheer expanse of the dramatic dunal system provided a desert location for film production between the 1940s and 1980s. The landmark qualities of the Cronulla Sand Dune, which rises 33 metres at its apex, have been enhanced by the fact that it is the last significant undisturbed dune in what was a massive dune system. The Cronulla Sand Dune together with the adjacent Lucas Reserve and Wanda Beach survives as an important coastal landscape, synonymous with Cronulla.

The place has a strong or special association with a particular community or cultural group in New South Wales for social, cultural or spiritual reasons.

The site has historic and cultural significance for the Aboriginal community. The Cronulla Sand Dune is of cultural heritage and spiritual significance to the La Perouse Aboriginal community, some of whom are direct descendants of the Aboriginal leaders who met Captain Cook in 1770. The undisturbed dune is of significant interest to the Aboriginal community as many of the other hills and dunes inhabited by their ancestors have been removed or disturbed since sand removal commenced in the 1930s. The community asserts that the area is known as a burial site. As the last major undisturbed sand dune in this area, the Cronulla Sand Dune has been the focus of long-term local and environmental activism. The Sutherland Shire community has been actively seeking the recognition and protection of the Cronulla Sand Dune for almost a decade and it has become a significant reference point for the contemporary Sutherland community. The proposed local heritage listing of the sand dune by Sutherland Council received 642 supporting signatures in 1999. The Cronulla Sand Dune has strong social significance as a place of recreation for residents and tourists alike since the late nineteenth century. The sand dunes, some of which rose up to 44 metres (144 ft), were the focus for many local residents and tourists who engaged in sand sledding, hand gliding and horse riding amongst the dunes.

The place has potential to yield information that will contribute to an understanding of the cultural or natural history of New South Wales.

The site has historic and cultural significance for the Aboriginal community. The Cronulla Sand Dune has the potential to yield further information on the Aboriginal habitation of this area. The drifting nature of the dune ensures that it entombs burials and environmental material as it moves. The Cronulla Sand Dune has been acknowledged as having some potential to contain archaeological material such as shell middens, artefacts or burial sites. The water bodies adjacent to the Cronulla Sand Dune are an important breeding ground for the endangered Green and Golden Bell Frog and hence have the potential to yield further scientific information on the Green and Golden Bell Frog. The Cronulla Sand Dune provides evidence of the impacts of agriculture and logging on the dunal landscape, an area of ongoing research in Australia.

The place possesses uncommon, rare or endangered aspects of the cultural or natural history of New South Wales.

The site has historic and cultural significance for the Aboriginal community. The Cronulla Sand Dune is an excellent example of the remnant Cronulla dune system as it existed prior to the commencement of sand removal in the 1930s. The denuded dune demonstrates the effects of timber getting and grazing activities in the nineteenth century and their contribution to the creation of a modified landscape. In its relationship to adjacent Lucas Reserve and Wanda Beach and the surrounding environment degraded by sand removal, the Cronulla Sand Dune serves to demonstrate the scale of environmental transformation that has taken place over the last two hundred years including the creation of habitat for the endangered Green and Golden Bell Frog.

The place is important in demonstrating the principal characteristics of a class of cultural or natural places/environments in New South Wales.

The site has historic and cultural significance for the Aboriginal community. Sand dune systems close to Sydney are rare. Whilst the coastal sand dune communities of Kurnell have been substantially degraded as a consequence of 70 years of sand removal, the surviving unvegetated Cronulla Sand Dune is intact and remains an excellent example of the former dune landscape. The Cronulla Sand Dune in the context of its setting, intactness, aesthetic qualities and social significance is held in high community esteem. The water bodies formed by sand removal surrounding the Cronulla Sand Dune have been identified by NPWS as a significant habitat for the endangered Green and Golden Bell Frog.

== Geology and geomorphology ==
The geology and geomorphology of the area is characterised by an island of outcropping bedrock on the eastern headland and joined to other bedrock outcrops on its western end by a sand spit which forms the main part of the headland. The Peninsula still has quite a view overlapping transgressive barrier dunes and it is believed that they have shifted north from Bate Bay. Older stable parabolic dunes occur on a series of north to south oriented ridges and while most of the vegetation has been cleared, some dry sclerophyll woodland remains.

At one stage professional cricketers Glenn McGrath, Michael Clarke, Ricky Ponting, Brett Lee and Brad Haddin trained at the sand dunes daily in preparation for international test cricket. Anthony Mundine held a one-hour workout in the sandhills to prepare for his bout with WBA super-middleweight champion Mikkel Kessler. Amateur and professional Rugby league teams, especially those of the NRL also use the sandhills.

== See also ==
- Geography of Sydney
- Wanda Beach
