= Louis Clarke (antiquarian) =

British antiquarian, archaeologist, collector, and curator (1881–1960)

- 1906 portrait by Philip de László
- Born: Louis Colville Gray Clarke; 2 May 1881; Croydon, England
- Died: 13 December 1960 (aged 79); Cambridge, England
- Education: Trinity Hall, Cambridge; Exeter College, Oxford
- Employers: Museum of Archaeology and Anthropology, University of Cambridge; Fitzwilliam Museum

Louis Colville Gray Clarke FSA (1881–1960) was an English antiquarian, archaeologist, collector and curator.

He was curator of the Museum of Archaeology and Anthropology, University of Cambridge from 1922 to 1937 and then director of Fitzwilliam Museum from 1937 to 1946. He was a fellow of Trinity Hall, Cambridge.
