= Biyarung =

(1810–1888) Dharawal woman and cultural leader

Biyarung also known as Biddy Giles (c. 1810 – December 1888) was a Dharawal woman, from the Gweagal clan, who was a knowledge holder and during her childhood, experienced the increasing arrivals and spread of colonisation in Sydney, Australia.

She became a cultural leader, entrepreneur and tour guide who taught colonists words in the Dharawal language as well as stories and knowledge about her Country.

== Biography ==
Biyarung had connection and rights to lands across Dharawal country, including the Illawarra and Gamay (including Botany Bay) regions. Oral histories state that her father and uncle were two men who witnessed the landing of James Cook at Kurnell.

Little is known of Biyarung's early life but it is known that, as a young woman, she married Cooman, who was a Dharawal man, and they lived together at Campbelltown. It is unclear what happened to him but, by the 1850s she remarried to Paddy Davis (also known as Paddy Burragalung) and they lived together near Wollongong. She and Davis had two daughters, one of which was Ellen Anderson, who Biyarung passed on much of her deep cultural knowledge to and well as many Dharawal stories; Anderson later told many of these stories to Charles William Peck and they were included in his book Australian Legends (1925).

By the early 1860s Biyarung returned to Sydney and remarried again, this time to an Englishman named Billy Giles, and they ran a farm together at Mill Creek (Gurugurang), near Lucas Heights. Here, as well as farming, she spent significant amounts of time hunting and fishing. She and Giles would also often offer boating tours on the river where she, using her cultural knowledge of the lands and waters and would tale the opportunity to teach them Dharawal words as well tell stories and lore about her Country.

By the 1880s, and following Giles' death, Biyarung moved again to Dolls Point where she lived with family, including her brother Joey, and became to known to many as 'Granny Giles'. During this period she made frequent visits to Aboriginal camps in Kogarah Bay and Botany Bay.

Biyarung died in December 1888 and is buried at Rookwood Cemetery.

== Legacy ==
Biyarung is one of the few 19th century Aboriginal women whose life was recorded and, through her business and other relationships, she was able to challenge people's views about First Nations people and be self-sufficient. Knowledge that she passed on to her children and grandchildren and other, that she allowed to be recorded, has been instrumental in keeping Dharawal knowledge alive.

In 2024, the Biddy Giles Park in Kirrawee was named for her after a vote was held which showed overwhelming support.
