= Nicholas Thomas (anthropologist) =

British/Australian anthropologist

Nicholas Jeremy Thomas FBA FAHA (born 1960) is an Australian-born anthropologist, Professor of Historical Anthropology, and Director, Museum of Archaeology and Anthropology, University of Cambridge since 2006, and Fellow of Trinity College, Cambridge since 2007.

== Career ==
Thomas was born in Australia in 1960. In 1984 he travelled to the Pacific Islands to research his PhD thesis on the Marquesas Islands. He has worked in Fiji and New Zealand, various archives and museums in Europe, North America, and in the Pacific region.

He was elected as a Corresponding Fellow of the Australian Academy of the Humanities in 1997, and around that time was also the inaugural Director of the Centre for Cross-Cultural Research (CCR) at the Australian National University. In 2003 Thomas was listed as being a Professor of Anthropology at Goldsmiths College, University of London.

Thomas was elected to the British Academy in 2005, and became a Fellow of Trinity College, Cambridge, in 2007.

He participated in a workshop at the British Museum from November 2016 to examine the provenance of the Gweagal Shield, the shield originating from the Aboriginal Australian Gweagal people of the Botany Bay area, believed to have been taken in April 1770 by Captain Cook's expedition. The workshop concluded that it was not that specific shield, and Thomas' paper on it was included in Australian Historical Studies along with another report from the workshop.

== Current positions ==
As of 2020 he is Professor of Historical Anthropology and Director at the Museum of Archaeology and Anthropology at the University of Cambridge, a member of the Conseil d’orientation scientifique of the Musée du Quai Branly in Paris as well as the International Advisory Board of the Humboldt Forum in Berlin.

== Awards and honours ==
Thomas was the 1995 winner of the Max Crawford Medal. He was awarded the 2010 Wolfson History Prize for his book Islanders: The Pacific in the Age of Empire.

== Selected publications ==
- Gauguin and Polynesia (2024) ISBN 978-1-80110-523-1
- Islanders: The Pacific in the Age of Empire (2010) ISBN 978-030-018056-5
- Rauru: Tene Waitere, Maori Carving, Colonial History (2008), with Mark Adams
- Hiapo: Past and present in Niuean barkcloth (2005), with John Pule, ISBN 1-877372-00-5
- Discoveries: The Voyages of Captain Cook (2003) ISBN 978-0-713-99557-2
- Possessions: Indigenous Art/Colonial Culture (1999)
- Oceanic Art (World of Art) (1995), ISBN 978-0-500-20281-4
- Entangled Objects (1991)
