= Gweagal =

Aboriginal Australian clan

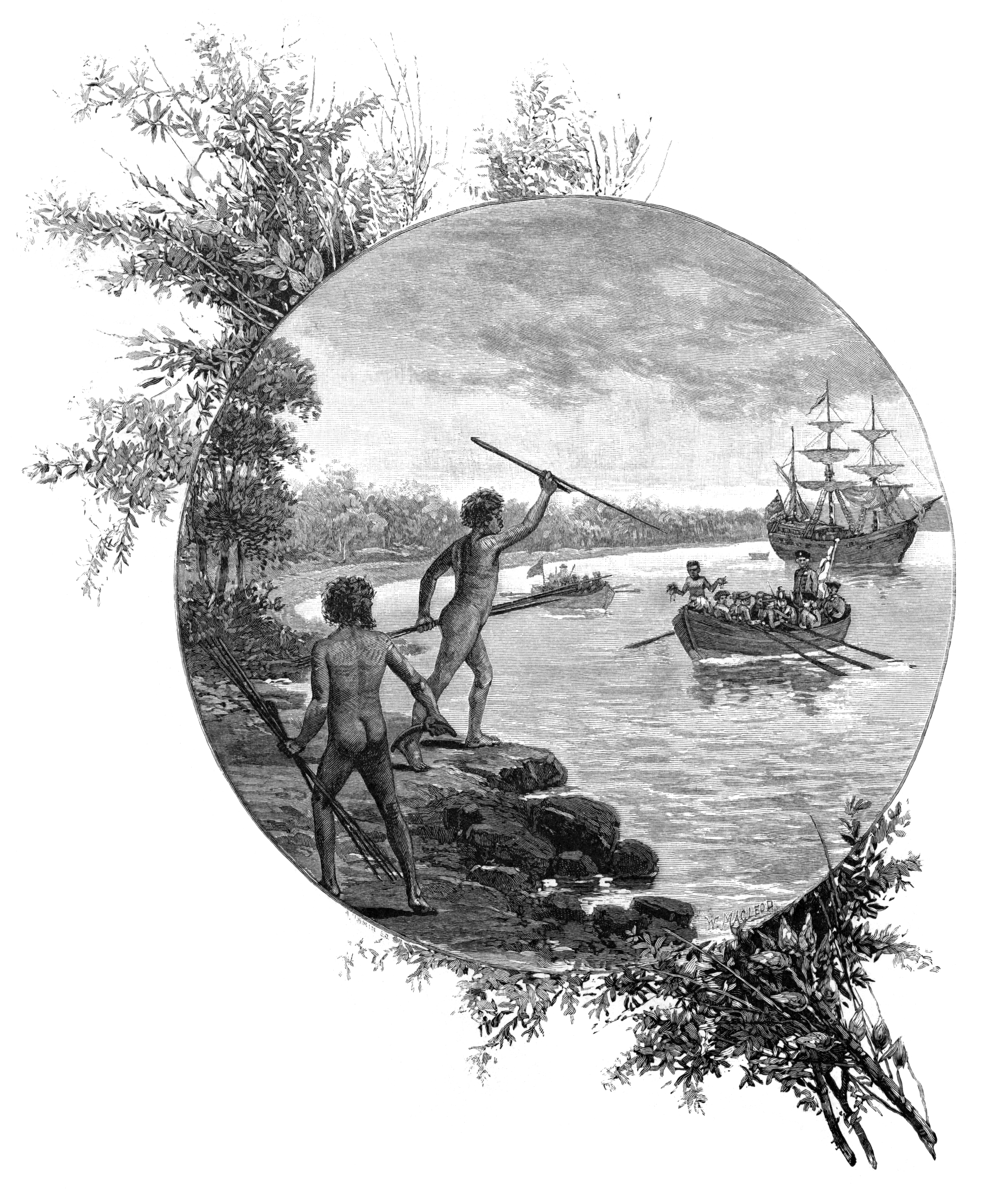
Artwork depicting the first contact with Captain James Cook & crew on the shores of the Kurnell Peninsula, New South Wales

The Gweagal (also spelt Gwiyagal) are a clan of the Dharawal people of Aboriginal Australians. (Note: Norman Tindale thought they were part of the Eora (Tindale 1974, p. 128).) Their descendants are traditional custodians of the southern areas of Sydney, New South Wales, Australia.

== Country ==
The Gweagal lived on the area of the southern side of the Georges River and Botany Bay stretching towards the Kurnell Peninsula. Their traditional lands, while not clearly defined, might have extended over much of the area from Cronulla to as far west as Liverpool.

== Culture ==
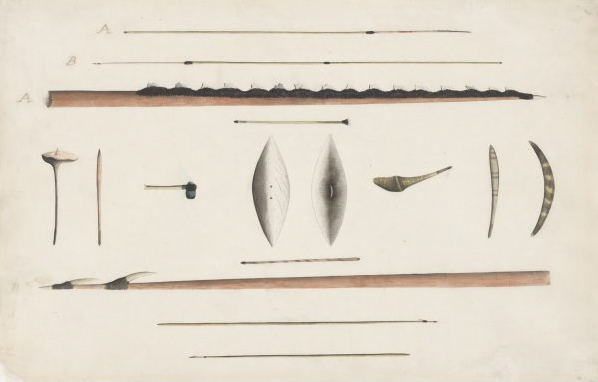
Aboriginal hunting implements and weapons

The Gweagal are the traditional owners of the white clay pits in their territory, which are considered sacred. Historically clay was used to line the base of their canoes so they could light fires, and also as a white body paint, (as witnessed by Captain James Cook). Colour was added to the clay using berries, which produced a brightly coloured paint that was used in ceremonies. It was also eaten as a medicine, an antacid. Geebungs and other local berries were mixed in the clay.

== Aboriginal rock shelters ==
Natural and modified caves or rock shelters were utilised by the Gweagal, including during walkabout – seasonally guided maintenance of land and the "natural gardens" tended by the Aboriginal people. A rock cave collapse at Port Hacking before 1770 claimed many lives of the Gweagal. This cave was later dynamited, revealing many skeletons. In the Royal National Park some of the caves were used as burial sites. In tribal lands and Dreamtime places this cultural practice continues.

There is a large cave located in Peakhurst with its ceiling blackened from smoke. There are caves located around Evatt Park, Lugarno with oyster shells ground into the cave floor. A cave has also been discovered near a Baptist church in Lugarno, and another near Margaret Crescent, Lugarno (now destroyed by development), which was found to contain ochre and a spearhead on the floor of the cave when it was excavated. Another cave exists on Mickey's Point, Padstow, which was named after a local Gweagal man.

The Gweagal decorated their caves and homes with carvings, sculpture, beads, paintings, drawings and etchings using white, red and other coloured earth, clay or charcoal. Symbols such as "water well" with a red ochre hand directed newcomers to wells and water storage. Footprints on a line signalled that there were stairs or steps in the area. The dwellings had thermal mass which help to keep an even temperature year-round. Rugs, furs and woven mats provided further warmth and comfort. Fire was used to cook, produce materials and keep their shelters warm.

== Food source ==
The territory of the Gweagal had much to offer. The Georges River provided fish and oysters. Various small creeks, most of which are now covered drains, provided fresh water. Men and women fished in canoes or from the shore using barbed spears and fishing lines with hooks that were crafted from crescent-shaped pieces of shell. Waterfowl could be caught in the swamplands near Towra Point and the variety of soils supported a variety of edible and medicinal plants. Birds and their eggs, possums, wallabies and goannas were also a part of their staple diet. The abundant food source meant that this group was less nomadic than those of Outback Australia.

== Middens ==
Middens have been found all the way along tidal sections of the Georges River where shells, fish bones, and other waste products have been thrown into heaps. These, as well as environmental modifications such as dams, building foundations, large earthen excavations and wells, gives evidence of where the Gweagal established villages for long periods, and are found where oysters, fresh water, and strategic views come together. Middens have been found in Oatley, and Oatley Point was known as a feasting ground. In Lugarno a midden is still existent and may be found in Lime Kiln Bay.

== History ==
=== First contact with Europeans ===
The Gweagal first made visual contact with Cook and other Europeans on the 29 April 1770 in the area which is now known as "Captain Cook's Landing Place", in the Kurnell area of Kamay Botany Bay National Park. It was the first attempt made, on Cook's first voyage, in the Endeavour, to make contact with the Aboriginal people of Australia.

In sailing into the bay, Cook noted two Gweagal men posted on the rocks, brandishing spears and fighting sticks, and a group of four too intent on fishing to pay much attention to the ship's passage. Using a telescope as they lay offshore, approximately a kilometre from an encampment consisting of 6–8 gunyahs, Joseph Banks recorded observing an elderly woman come out of the bush, with at first three children in tow, then another three, and light a fire. While busying herself, she looked at the ship at anchor without showing any perplexity. She was joined by the four fishermen, who brought their catch to be cooked.

When Cook and crew made their first landfall two Gweagal men came down to the boat to fend off what they thought to be spirits of the dead. They shouted "Warra warra wai," meaning "You are all dead," and gestured with their spears. Cook's party attempted to communicate their desire for water and threw gifts of beads and nails ashore. The two Aboriginal men continued to oppose the landing and Cook fired a warning shot. One of the Gweagal men responded by throwing a rock, and Cook fired on them with small shot, wounding one of them in the leg. The crew then landed, and the Gweagal men threw two spears before Cook fired another round of small shot and they retreated. The landing party found several children in nearby huts, and left some beads and other gifts with them. The landing party collected 40 to 50 spears and other artefacts.

Cook and his crew stayed at Botany Bay for a week, collecting water, timber, fodder and botanical specimens and exploring the surrounding area. The Indigenous inhabitants observed the Europeans closely but generally retreated whenever they approached. Cook's party made several attempts to establish relations with the Indigenous people, but they showed no interest in the food and gifts the Europeans offered, and occasionally threw spears as an apparent warning.^{[b]}

==== The Gweagal Spears and Shield ====
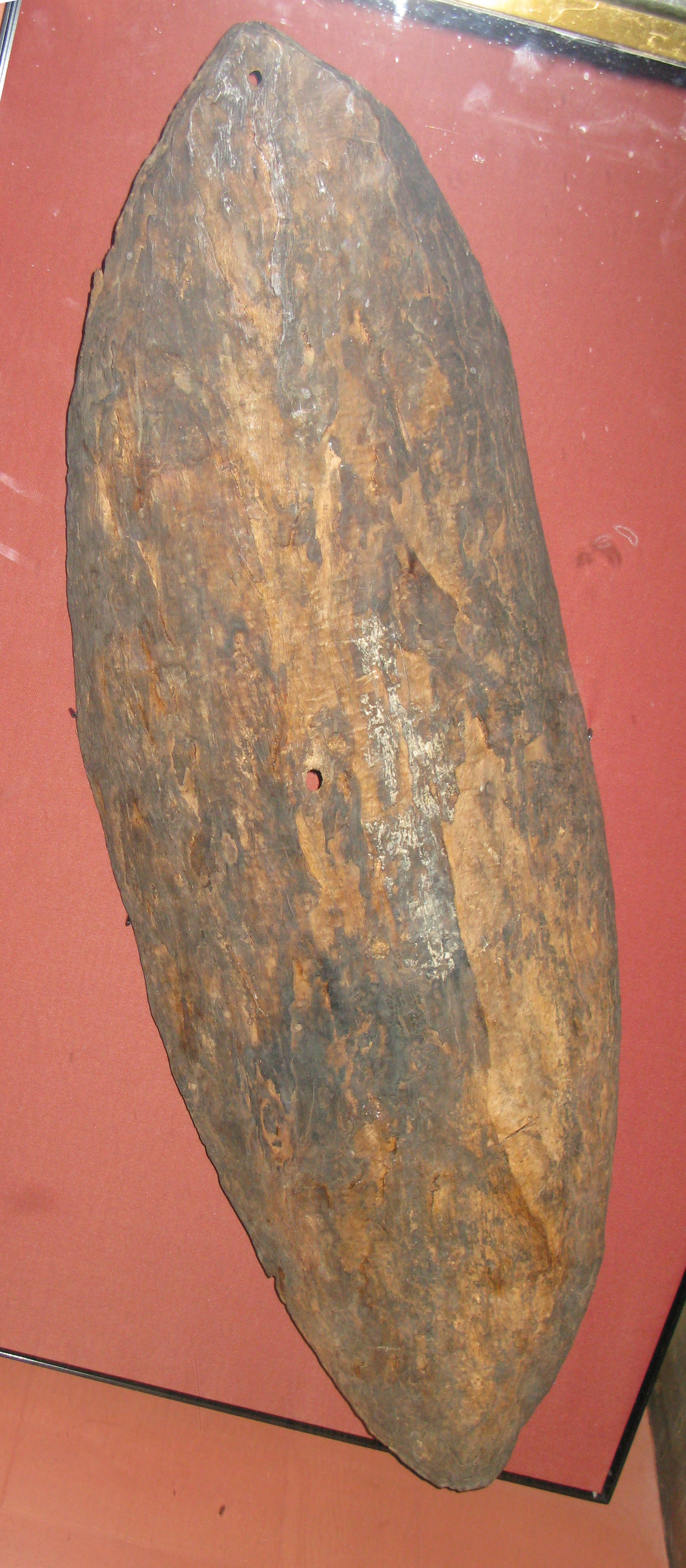
The shield at the British Museum once thought to be the "Gweagal" shield

Cook and Banks returned to England in 1771 with a large collection of flora, fauna and cultural artefacts from their first Pacific voyage. This included 40 to 50 spears from the Gweagal people. Banks was convinced the spears were abandoned (on the shores of Kurnell) and "thought it no improper measure to take with them all the lances which they could find, somewhere between 40 or 50". Cook gave some of the spears to his patron, John Montagu, First Lord of the Admiralty and Fourth Earl of Sandwich, who then gave them, to his alma mater Trinity College at the University of Cambridge in England. The La Perouse Local Aboriginal Land Council and La Perouse Aboriginal Community Alliance worked with the Cambridge museum towards repatriation of the three known remaining spears. On 23 April 2024, the spears were repatriated to the Gweagal people by the university.

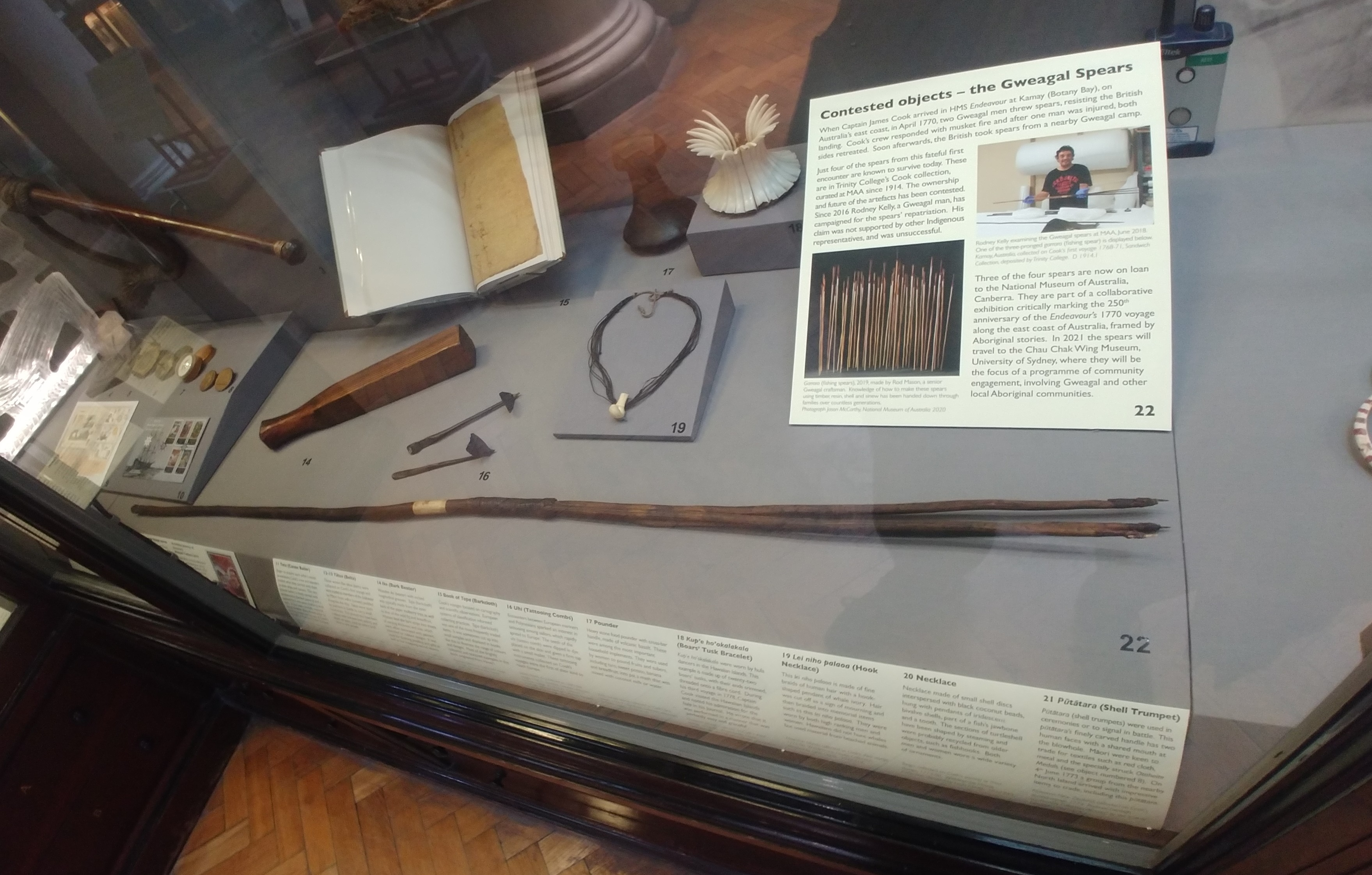
Gweagal spear formerly on display at Museum of Archaeology & Anthropology, Cambridge

The British Museum holds an Aboriginal shield which it had previously identified as probably the one acquired from Botany Bay in 1770. The shield was lent to the National Museum of Australia in Canberra for an exhibition called Encounters: Revealing stories of Aboriginal and Torres Strait Islander objects from the British Museum, from November 2015 to March 2016. Shayne Williams, a Gweagal elder of the La Perouse Community of Botany Bay, saw the shield, thought it was not typical of locally made shields, and asked the British Museum to further investigate its provenance. Following the investigation, anthropologist Nicholas Thomas concluded in 2018 that the shield is made of red mangrove and is not the one taken from Botany Bay in 1770. Williams states that it is very likely a Gugu Yimidhirr shield acquired by Cook during his stay at the Endeavour River in north Queensland (a region where red mangrove is abundant).

Historian and archivist Mike Jones, while not disputing the outcome of the workshop or Thomas' conclusion, has challenged the use of purely European sources and perspectives to support the provenance of Indigenous artefacts, saying that the shield has become a "cultural touchstone". Legal academic Sarah Keenan wrote in 2017 that Indigenous perspectives and methodologies were not used in the workshop, and a different conclusion may have been reached, or other knowledge gained about its significance, had such methods been applied. However, representatives from the local indigenous community did participate in the workshop and their perspectives were taken into account. Thomas states that the fact that the shield is not the one represented in the story of the Gweagal Shield does not mean that it should not be repatriated.

== Notable people ==
- Biyarung, or Biddy Giles, (b.1820-died ca 1890s) was a Gweagal woman who lived throughout her life on traditional Gweagal land, and frequently impressed whites who employed her as a guide by her profound knowledge of the botany and landscape. She was a fluent Dharawal speaker.
- Rodney Kelly (born 1977) is a Gweagal activist campaigning for the return of a shield held by the British Museum, as well as other Indigenous Australian artefacts in museums across Europe and Australia.

== See also ==
- Eora
- Repatriation (cultural heritage)
- Tharawal
- Australian Aboriginal artefacts

== Sources ==
- "Aboriginal History". Sutherland Shire (Stralia Web). n.d.
- Banks, Sir Joseph (28 April 1770). "Banks's Journal: Daily Entries". National Library of Australia, South Seas Collection.
- "Botany Bay, New South Wales: Gweagal and Bidjigal country". National Museum of Australia. Archived from the original on 3 May 2019.
- Brennan, Bridget (10 May 2019). "The battle at the British Museum for a 'stolen' shield that could tell the story of Captain Cook's landing". ABC News (Australian Broadcasting Corporation).
- "Captain Cook's Landing Place". NSW National Parks and Wildlife Service.
- Daley, Paul (25 September 2016). "The Gweagal shield and the fight to change the British Museum's attitude to seized artefacts". The Guardian.
- "Decolonisation of museums". Google Scholar.
- "Encounters". National Museum of Australia.
- "Endeavour Voyage". National Museum of Australia. 8 April 2020. Archived from the original on 21 April 2020.
- Fennell, Marc; Wiggins, Nick (25 January 2021). "A shield, some spears, and the symbolism people find in the stuff the British stole". ABC News.
- Goodall, Heather; Cadzow, Allison (2009). Rivers and Resilience: Aboriginal People on Sydney's Georges River. University of New South Wales Press. ISBN 978-1-921-41074-1.
- Jones, Michael (14 March 2019). "Collections in the Expanded Field: Relationality and the Provenance of Artefacts and Archives". Heritage. 2 (1): 884–897. doi:10.3390/heritage2010059.
- Keenan, Sarah (11 November 2016). "Give back the Gweagal shield". Critical Legal Thinking. Interview with Rodney Kelly, Vincent Forrester and Roxley Foley.
- Keenan, Sarah (18 May 2018). "How the British Museum Changed its Story About the Gweagal Shield". Australian Critical Race and Whiteness Studies Association. Archived from the original on 27 September 2020.
- Lauder, Simon (23 July 2018). "No evidence Aboriginal shield taken by Captain Cook: British Museum". ABC Radio.
- Lawrence, Joan (1999). A Pictorial History of Canterbury Bankstown. Kingsclear Books. ISBN 978-0-908-27255-6.
- Malvern, Jack (8 December 2018). "250 years on, Captain James Cook's foes want their shield back". The Times. ISSN 0140-0460.
- McGuinness, Tim (n.d.). "Aussie People – Aborigines – Use of Caves". McGuinnessPublishing. Archived from the original on 29 August 2008.
- McKenna, Mark (2018). Moment of Truth: History and Australia's Future. Quarterly Essay 69. Black. ISBN 978-1-743-82037-7.
- "Dr Mike Jones". ANU Researcher Portal.
- Miller, Nick (11 May 2019). "The gripping story of the Gweagal Shield". The Sydney Morning Herald.
- Nugent, Maria; Sculthorpe, Gaye (2018). "A Shield Loaded with History: Encounters, Objects and Exhibitions". Australian Historical Studies. 49 (1): 28–43. doi:10.1080/1031461X.2017.1408663. S2CID 149036662.
- "Once were warriors". The Sydney Morning Herald. 11 November 2002.
- "Professor Nicholas Thomas: Director & Curator". The Museum of Archaeology and Anthropology, Cambridge.
- Shoebridge, David (3 November 2016). "Supporting the repatriation of the Gweagal Shield".
- Silva, Nadine (29 April 2021). "Historic Gweagal spears stolen at First Contact are repatriated back to Eora-Sydney". NITV.
- Thomas, Nicholas (2018). "A Case of Identity: The Artefacts of the 1770 Kamay (Botany Bay) Encounter". Australian Historical Studies. 49 (1): 4–27. doi:10.1080/1031461X.2017.1414862. S2CID 149069484 – via ResearchGate.
- Tindale, Norman Barnett (1974). "Eora (NSW)". Aboriginal Tribes of Australia: Their Terrain, Environmental Controls, Distribution, Limits, and Proper Names. Australian National University. Archived from the original on 8 April 2017.
- Turbet, Peter (2011). The First Frontier. Rosenberg Publishing. ISBN 978-1-922-01300-2.
- "Visiting Academic Research Seminar: Dr Sarah Keenan". University of Technology (UTS) Sydney. 25 September 2017.
- Voon, Claire (19 June 2017). "Why an Indigenous Australian Wants the British Museum to Return His Ancestor's Shield". Hyperallergic.
- "Dr Sarah Keenan". Queen Mary University of London (QMUL) School of Law.
