= Timbery =

Timbery is a surname. Notable people with the surname include:

- Emma Timbery (c.1842–1916), Aboriginal Australian shellworker and matriarch
- Esme Timbery (1931–2023), Australian Bidjigal shellworker, great-granddaughter of Emma
