= Joseph Timbery Jr =

Australian boomerang maker

Joe Timbery
- Born: Joseph Timbery Jr; 1 March 1912; Redfern, Sydney
- Died: 18 November 1978 (aged 66)
- Other names: Timbery, King of the Five Islands
- Occupations: Teacher at Sydney Boomerang School, Boomerang Craftsman
- Years active: c1940 - 1978
- Known for: World Champion Thrower, Boomerang Craftsman
- Notable work: Boomerangs

Joseph Timbery Jr (1 March 1912 - 18 November 1978) was a Wallangang Indigenous-Australian expert maker of boomerangs, a world champion thrower, and a teacher at the Sydney Boomerang School. He was mostly known for his decorated Timbery Boomerangs.

== Early life ==
In March 1912, Joe Timbery was born in Redfern, Sydney in the Timbery Family. He spent most of his life at La Perouse with his family. His grandfather died in 1952. His grandmother, Emma Timbery known as Queen Timbery (1842 - 1916) was a known shell worker, sold her works to tourists and exhibited on the Royal Easter Show in London, 1910. Similarly, Joe entered the same market before coming famous for his engraved and painted boomerangs, and his excellence in throwing.

=== Timbery Boomerang ===
In order to craft a boomerang, Joe would source his materials with mangrove elbows from Kurnell peninsula, Botany Bay. He was also invited to travel across Australia to throw his boomerangs, from southern NSW to Dubbo and Wellington, to also find material for his boomerangs. These boomerangs were made of mangrove and mulga wood.

Instructions on how to throw a Boomerang, by Joe Timbery

Stand with feet facing 45 degrees to the right of the wind.

This means that if the wind is from the north, you stand facing nor-east. Grip one end of the boomerang with the flat side against the palm of the hand.

Hold it so that the other point is upright, but sloping slightly away from you about ten degrees from the vertical.

Take one step forward with your left foot and swing your right hand back behind your head.

Be careful not to disturb the angle of holding. Take one step with the right foot and at the same time throw the boomerang, making sure it is released at the instant it is level with the face.

The more force and wrist-strength, the farther the throw. If the boomerang circles to your right, you have thrown too far to the right of the wind; if it lands too far to the left, you have thrown too directly into the wind.

== Career ==
Together with his cousin Laddie Timbery, they would go on tours, throw and craft boomerangs.

Evidence to prove Joe's claim as a world champion thrower was lost to history, stated by author and historian Pauline Curby.

=== 1954 Royal Tour and Boomerang Teaching Career ===
In the 1954 Royal Tour for Queen Elizabeth II at Wagga Wagga, Joe Timbery brought his family over and demonstrated his throwing of a boomerang. Afterwards, he presented her with a boomerang afterwards. It was reported that her majesty stayed for an extra 10 minutes past her schedule to enjoy the show. As a teacher, he gave lessons to notable people such as ABBA, Cliff Richard, and Harry Belafonte at the Sydney Boomerang School. Joe Timbery would also tour the world sharing Australian Aboriginal culture through Boomerang throwing demonstrations, such as the Taj Mahal and the Eiffel Tower. He was also known for his story-telling, and was a keen writer in poetry.

== 1956 - 1978 ==
Prior to the 1956 Olympics, located in the Blue Mountains, Joe Timbery demonstrated and threw his boomerangs in the presence of Olympic Games president Avery Brundage, with the audience of visiting international tourists. It was stated that he would be a gold medalist, if there ever was one for such. As a way to cut prices and make boomerangs more efficiently, plywood was used. In the 1960s, Joe Timbery begun making boomerangs for Duncan Maclennan, owner of the Sydney Boomerang School.

=== Joe Timbery Museum ===
YOU BUY EM’, WE’LL TRY EM’ A slogan from the museum

Located at La Perouse is the Joe Timbery Museum, where he and his family sold boomerangs, and where a representative from the Buckingham Palace visited. After his death in 1978, Laddie Timbery would continue running the museum and store.

== Death and legacy ==
On November 18, 1978, Joe Timbery died aged 66. A burial event at Matraville, Randwick City was held. His legacy as an expert craftsman, as a business entrepreneur, and as a showman lives on through his descendants.

=== Visitor from Buckingham Palace ===
It was reported that a visitor from the Buckingham Palace came down to Joe's Museum at La Perouse and met his grandchildren to specifically purchase a boomerang crafted by Joe Timbery, under the advice of Queen Elizabeth II.
