= La Perouse Mission Church =

- Location within Sydney
- 33°59′01″S 151°14′01″E
- Location: 46 Adina Avenue, La Perouse, New South Wales
- Country: Australia
- Denomination: Non-denominational

History
- Status: Church

Architecture
- Functional status: Abandoned
- Years built: 1894–1930
- Closed: 1999

New South Wales Heritage Register
- Official name: La Perouse Mission Church; Colebrook Memorial Aboriginal Evangelical Church
- Type: State heritage (built)
- Designated: 15 March 2013
- Reference no.: 1893
- Type: Historic site
- Category: Aboriginal

The La Perouse Mission Church is a heritage-listed former church building and now vacant building and unused church located at 46 Adina Avenue, La Perouse, New South Wales, Australia. It was built from 1894 to 1930. It is also known as Colebrook Memorial Aboriginal Evangelical Church. The property is owned by La Perouse Local Aboriginal Land Council. It was added to the New South Wales State Heritage Register on 15 March 2013.

== History ==
La Perouse is situated 14 kilometres (8.7 mi) south of the Sydney central business district on the northern headland of Botany Bay. Named for a French navigator who stayed in the area for six weeks in 1788, La Perouse is the only Sydney suburb where Aboriginal people have held on to their territory from settlement until the present day. Its history is a story of the survival of the Aboriginal culture in the face of European invasion. It is also the story of a suburb where Aboriginal people and Europeans from a wide variety of backgrounds co-existed and established relationships on their own terms in the mid 20th century outside the prevailing government programs of separation and assimilation.

=== Indigenous presence at La Perouse, 1870s to 1930s ===
The 1870s marked a change in the nature of the Aboriginal community at La Perouse. Many Aboriginal people who had been forced off their lands on the South Coast by dairy farming moved to Sydney to seek employment or government rations. Informal refuges developed at La Perouse and Blacktown. La Perouse was known to government officials as the "blacks camp".

In the early 1880s, the colonial government was under increasing pressure to take action on Aboriginal affairs. In 1882 Henry Parkes appointed George Thornton as Protector of Aborigines. Thornton believed that Aboriginal people should be removed from urban locations. Yet he did honour the request of five Aboriginal men and their families to be allowed to stay at La Perouse. He justified his decision to Parliament by arguing that the camp was economically viable, in contrast with other camps in Sydney which were seen as parasitic and a nuisance to society. Thornton organised for huts to be built for people camped at La Perouse. By 1881 there were approximately 50 Aboriginal people living in two camps in the Botany Bay region: 35 at La Perouse and the remainder at Botany Bay. Residents were free to travel between the camps.

In 1883 Thornton's position was replaced by the Aborigines Protection Board (APB), which followed a more isolationist and protectionist policy. The Board established Aboriginal reserves, which effectively segregated Aboriginal people from white Australians throughout New South Wales.

In 1885 a small Anglican mission was established at La Perouse. The mission provided religious instruction, food, shelter and basic education. A church was built on Frenchman's Beach in 1894. In 1894, the mission was included in the annual report of the New South Wales Aborigines Protection Association.

In 1895 seven acres (2.4 hectares) of land at La Perouse were gazetted by the NSW Government as a "Reserve for the Use of Aborigines"—the only one in Sydney. The APB's decision was partly prompted by the desire of the local Aboriginal people to protect their homes and lifestyle from the encroachment of commercialism and missionaries.

The APB managed the reserve. In the first decades the reserve was run by the resident missionary with a policeman. In later decades (and certainly by the 1940s) there was a resident manager (often a retired soldier or former gaol warden) whose wife would act as the matron. With the introduction of the reserve manager, the resident missionary retained responsibility only for the church and its missionary activities to the community. The manager lived down the hill from the church, separate to the resident missionary. Managers and missionaries worked separately on the reserve. While the reserve managers were generally disliked, the La Perouse Aboriginal community "loved" the resident missionaries (Friends of La Perouse: 2012, pers. comm.).

The Aboriginal population was segregated from the Europeans on the reserve to "protect" them from the white community. They received rations only and no other benefits, which tied them to the reserve. In 1895 the reserve was enclosed by a fence and only the local constable and the resident missionary had a key. Aboriginal people on the reserve were literally locked in. A boom gate was built at the entrance to the reserve which survived into the 1950s.

As late as the 1940s, permission was needed from the reserve manager for an Aboriginal person to enter or leave the reserve. The manager had the right of eviction and entry to all homes on the reserve. In 1918 the APB was granted power to remove Aboriginal children under 18 from the reserves without parental consent if the Board considered removal was in the child's best interests

The Board provided fishing nets to facilitate self-sufficiency on the reserve, but due to fishing being seasonal around La Perouse many people still travelled to their traditional lands around the Illawarra and South Coast. When the Department of Fisheries introduced a licensing system in New South Wales, Aboriginal people were prevented from selling fish at the markets. They were only able to fish for personal consumption, and even this was restricted by the actions of local fishermen.

The APB was also concerned that Aboriginal people from outside Sydney would travel to La Perouse and from there gain access to the city. Restrictions were therefore placed on Aboriginal people at La Perouse travelling by rail or boat to Sydney.

After 1886 when the Hampden Road "valley" area of Paddington was promoted for "industrial purposes" and population there increased along with pressure for more housing. Aboriginals in the valley and Rushcutters Bay had been transferred to La Perouse by the time of later land sales (1898, 1903).

By 1897, the APB had decided that the La Perouse reserve was no longer suitable for Aboriginal occupation. Both the NSW Department of Lands and the missionaries on the reserve disagreed with the APB's decision. They argued that it would be difficult to move the Aboriginal people because of their long history of occupation of the area.

In 1897 the APB rejected requests from missionaries for more huts and increased rations because it was thought that this would encourage more people to move from the South Coast to La Perouse. Nevertheless, by 1900, the APB had decided that it would relocate the Aboriginal people from La Perouse reserve to Wallaga Lake on the South Coast.

The La Perouse residents refused to move, however, even though the APB reduced, and eventually ceased supplying, their rations. By 1902, it seems that the APB had given up its relocation plans and resumed supplying rations to those on the reserve.

In 1908 there were 73 people living on the reserve and new houses were built. By 1912, the reserve's population had grown to 106, and to 124 by 1915.

The APB disliked, but was unable to stop, the increase in the number of non-Aboriginal Australians making day trips to La Perouse following the opening of the tram line from central Sydney to La Perouse in 1910. The La Perouse Aboriginal people participated in the tourist industry, selling boomerangs and other souvenirs, including the famed shellwork produced by the Aboriginal women. From the 1920s until the 1960s, Aboriginal artists and snake show demonstrations were popular, in a pit near the Loop (where the tram line terminated). Beryl Beller remembered collecting shells with her mother to glue onto various cardboard cut-outs and sell to tourists. Lee-Anne Mason recalled waiting in anticipation for the weekend tourists to arrive. People would "be flocking in all day" to watch Mr Cann, the snake man. She also recalled diving for pennies and how she would always manage to catch the penny before it hit the sand.

The La Perouse community also engaged with tourists over the 1932 celebrations for opening of the Sydney Harbour Bridge. Members of the community walked across the bridge in kangaroo skins at its opening. The event is commemorated in La Perouse with the two engravings on the sandstone outcrop just south of the church.

After World War II the tourists included migrants from Mediterranean Europe who felt an affinity with the La Perouse beach and landscape.

Moving the Aboriginal people from La Perouse re-emerged as an issue during the 1920s when Randwick Council responded to pressure from the South Kensington and District Chamber of Commerce which wrote to the APB expressing concerns about the reserve's housing conditions, sanitation and "morality". The APB agreed that the reserve should be moved. But again, the people on the reserve refused to move. In 1928, a petition signed by 53 reserve residents was published in the Sydney Morning Herald. It read:

'We, the undersigned aborigines of the La Perouse reserve, emphatically protest against our removal to any place. This is our heritage bestowed upon us: in these circumstances we feel justified in refusing to leave'.

As a compromise measure, Randwick Council in 1931 converted the foreshore section of the original reserve into a park and public recreation area, and moved the huts away from the waterfront.

=== Depression camps at La Perouse, 1930s to 1960s ===
From the start of the Depression in 1929 hundreds of unemployed people moved to La Perouse to camp close to the beaches with access to fresh water, natural shelter and the ocean. Three separate camps for the unemployed were set up at La Perouse. They were Hill 60, Frog Hollow and Happy Valley. Simple huts were erected of corrugated iron roofing, white-washed hessian walls and earth floors. Food was scrounged from the local fishermen and Chinese market gardeners. The government provided one pint of milk per family per day.

Happy Valley was the largest of the camps, with a stable population of over 300. It was located opposite the Aboriginal mission, next to Anzac Parade, in a gully behind Congwong Beach. Frog Hollow was an Aboriginal camp, also near the reserve. Many who set up camp at Frog Hollow were relatives of Aboriginal people living on the reserve. The communities of these two camps enjoyed a good relationship and much interaction with the Aboriginal people on the reserve. Aboriginal-European relationships resulted in many marriages and children. Non-Aboriginal partners, however, were not allowed to live on the reserve.

The camps offered a measure of freedom that was not found on Aboriginal reserves. White and black children attended the same school, which was unusual at a time when government policy aimed to separate Indigenous and European Australians. Children didn't focus on the differences between them. One woman recalled that when someone raised the alarm that 'the welfare's coming' (meaning that the child welfare department had come to take Aboriginal children), both white and black children would run and hide in the bush, the white children unaware that the child welfare department had come only for Aboriginal children.

The camps remained after the Depression eased in 1934. Happy Valley was closed in 1939 by Randwick Council following pressure from the NSW Golf Course. Residents were rehoused and the huts demolished. Post World War II migrants from Poland, Russia, Ukraine, Germany, Malta and the Middle East who were either unemployed or homeless from the severe post-war housing shortage, joined Aboriginal people from the South Coast at the Frog Hollow and Hill 60 camps. These camps were closed in the 1950s and their occupants rehoused in the La Perouse and Matraville areas. The last huts were demolished in the 1960s.

Pam Koeneman, a long-term resident of La Perouse, commented that the mixing in of considerable numbers of Anglo-Celtic and European migrant Australians with the Aboriginal communities of La Perouse (both on the reserve or in the camps) resulted in a naturally occurring social experiment at La Perouse that began in the Depression years and which sat outside government policies of assimilation.

=== Housing and land rights at La Perouse, 1960s to 1980s ===
A scheme to provide cheap housing at La Perouse was introduced when Happy Valley was closed down. The houses were extremely basic boxes that had to be completed by the residents with no water, sewerage or electricity connections. Intended for white Australians, the scheme enabled some Aboriginal people to buy houses outside the reserve.

Randwick Council attempted again in the 1960s to close the reserve, to improve the image of La Perouse. Jack Horner, honorary secretary of the Australian-Aboriginal Fellowship wrote repeatedly to Randwick Council, the NSW and Federal governments asking for improved housing conditions, opposing the closure and relocation of the reserve and organising a petition. Once again Aboriginal Australians at La Perouse refused to move, and eventually the planned relocation was abandoned.

In 1966, Aboriginal land rights in New South Wales became a heated political issue. A Joint Parliamentary Inquiry into the Welfare of Aboriginals turned its attention to the reserve at La Perouse. Assimilation had been intended to gradually incorporate Aboriginal people into wider society, yet here they were living separate from, and in worse conditions than, the majority of white Australians. The Aborigines Protection Board and Randwick Council advocated closure of the reserve. The Inquiry, however, recognised the connections between Aboriginal people and the land and instead proposed a plan known as the "Endeavour Project." This would create a village where Aboriginal and non-Aboriginal people would live together. The project never eventuated, however, because Aboriginal people on the reserve argued that they had the right to keep the reserve for Aboriginal people only.

Instead, the reserve was redeveloped in 1972, and in 1973 it was handed to the NSW Aboriginal Lands Trust (following the abolition of the Aborigines Protection Board). Reserve residents filed a land claim to have ownership passed to them and in 1984 the newly established La Perouse Local Aboriginal Land Council was given the deeds to the reserve lands. The La Perouse Aboriginal community was the first Aboriginal community in Sydney to win freehold title to lands under the NSW Aboriginal Lands Right Act.

In 2008 there were around 420 people living at La Perouse with over one-third of the population being Aboriginal.

=== La Perouse Mission Church ===
The church was built around 1894 at an unknown location on Frenchmans Beach. In 1929–30 the church was relocated to its present site up the hill behind the beach at the corner of Adina and Elaroo Avenues. It was probably largely rebuilt during this relocation. The church remained in use until the 1990s when services ceased. The last appointed minister/missionary left in 1999.

The church is situated on the former seven-acre (2.4 ha) Aboriginal reserve at La Perouse that was established by the NSW colonial government in 1885.

During the late 1880s, missionary work began among the Aboriginal people at La Perouse, performed by a number of Christian groups. From one of these groups—the Petersham Congregational Christian Endeavour—an Aboriginal committee was formed. This group, (later called the La Perouse Aborigines Christian Endeavour Society) built the original mission church at the reserve in 1894, on Frenchman's Beach.

In 1894 the Mission House was built, Miss Jenny Watson was appointed as the first full-time missionary and the La Perouse Aborigines Christian Endeavour Society was formed with seven active members. In 1897 Retta Dixon (aged only 19) replaced Jenny Watson as the resident missionary.

Of the missionaries who worked at the church in its earliest decades, arguably the most important was Margaret Jane (Retta) Long (nee Dixon) (1878–1956) the daughter of Irish-born Baptists. Retta joined the New South Wales Christian Endeavour Union and began evangelizing at La Perouse Aborigines' Reserve where Christian Endeavour conducted Sunday services. Her father, Mathew Dixon, built two rooms onto the La Perouse church.

In 1899 the mission reconstituted itself as the New South Wales Aborigines' Mission (NSWAM) and shortly after Retta began work as a travelling missionary to Aboriginal communities in NSW. La Perouse became the base for evangelising Aboriginal communities. The Aboriginal people at La Perouse helped to secure Retta's welcome when she contacted Aboriginal communities on the NSW South Coast, and the Hawkesbury and Macleay rivers. From 1897 to 1901 Retta was instrumental in setting up 26 camps on the South Coast.

Public transport, and whatever the Christian Endeavour network supplied, were Retta's only means of travel. In 1899 she walked seventy miles (110 km) during one visit to South Coast communities. Retta held a profound belief in the power of the Gospel to transform the lives of "sinners". She considered the Aboriginal people to be in no way "inferior to the white race". She came to admire their spirituality, generosity and endurance. As a young missionary she was happy to accept their hospitality and their company on her journeys.

Unable to pay in full the money it owed, the NSWAM resolved in 1902 to function as a "faith mission" and to rely on God to supply its needs. Retta's role was supervisory in the field and inspirational there and elsewhere. She was an able publicist and her success encouraged support. The evangelical press reported in detail her travel, her needs (a lady's bicycle), her appearances at Sunday services, and the "bright singing and testimonies" of Aborigines with whom she worked.

In 1905 Retta left the NSWAM and La Perouse for Singleton to form the Aborigines' Inland Mission of Australia (AIM) that she ran as a faith mission (initially with her husband William, during his lifetime) for the rest of her life. AIM became one of the largest missionary societies that worked exclusively for Australian Aboriginal people in the 20th century.

The founding of AIM led to the creation of a number of missions in various other parts of Australia, but especially in NSW and Queensland. Retta's mission assisted dispossessed and semi-urban Aborigines. When she began her work, Aboriginal communities were re-forming on recently gazetted reserves, and in camps on town commons and river banks. This resulted in the physical separation and isolation of their communities. With government permission, the AIM built a church and a missionary residence on many of the reserves. Its missionaries lived among the Aborigines, often in similar material circumstances. According to Long's autobiography, "the most striking feature of the [missionary] work itself in this period was the appearance of a native ministry" in 1924.

Other than Retta Long, probably the most significant figure at La Perouse Mission Church was "Queen" Emma Timbery (c.1842–1916) an Aboriginal shellworker and "matriarch" of the La Perouse community. Emma married George ('Trimmer') Timbery at Botany in 1864 and by 1882 the Timbery's had moved to La Perouse where Aboriginal women earned extra income by gathering wildflowers and making shell baskets for sale in Sydney and the suburbs. Emma was particularly accomplished at the craft of shellwork—adorning small items such as boxes, baby shoes and boomerangs with shells. Shellwork had probably been introduced by missionaries who had spent time in the Pacific, as it appears to have no basis in traditional Aboriginal art forms. Aboriginal women at La Perouse became well known for their shellwork. This was a social activity, carried out in the company of other women. Each shellworker had an individual style. Emma regularly displayed and sold her handiwork at the Royal Easter Show in Sydney. In 1910 Emma's work was included in an exhibition of Australian manufactures in London. One Sydney newspaper reported that it was "almost fought for".

Emma was converted to Christianity in the early 1890s and began working with the missionaries at the La Perouse Aboriginal settlement, from whom she learned to read a little. In 1894 the La Perouse Aborigines' Christian Endeavour Society was formed, and Emma became its vice-president in 1895. That year the seven acres (2.8 hectares) occupied by the La Perouse Aboriginal settlement was gazetted as a reserve for its residents' exclusive use. Through their Christian work, she and the missionary Retta Dixon became "friends and comrades". When Dixon was installed as missionary at La Perouse in 1897, Emma, in front of a large crowd, promised Retta's father and friends to be a mother to her. Emma Timbery continued her missionary work with Retta Long. The two women often travelled together, visiting other Aboriginal settlements along the south coast to "spread the word". Emma made a valued contribution to the early work of the La Perouse (United) Aborigines Mission.

As the community matriarch, Emma became popularly known as "Queen", or "Granny" Timbery (sometimes spelt Timbury). She died on 26 November 1916 at La Perouse, survived by her husband, three sons and one daughter. Emma was buried in Botany cemetery, "in the presence of a large company of mourners", with her funeral expenses paid for by a "white friend", indicating her close association with missionaries and their supporters. A tribute in the Australian Aborigines Advocate noted that "many wreaths and other floral tributes were sent along, and numerous letters of sympathy from white and dark friends".

The La Perouse community believes that Queen Emma Timbery was granted by Queen Victoria lands corresponding to the present-day LALC landholding. Papers to this effect, however, were destroyed in a house fire on the reserve in the 1950s or 1960s.

Emma's grandson Joseph (1912–1978) won repute as a boomerang maker, and demonstrated his throwing skill on the Eiffel Tower in Paris and for Queen Elizabeth II on her visit to Sydney in 1954. The family workshop became the Bidjigal Aboriginal Corporation, based at Huskisson, Jervis Bay. Three fig trees at La Perouse Aboriginal reserve were dedicated in 1986 to the memory of Emma Timbery. The tradition of shellworking continued to be practised by many of her female descendants, including her great-granddaughter Esma Russell, nee Timbery.

In 1929–30 the church was relocated to its current site at La Perouse, along with the rest of the settlement, because the buildings were sinking into the sand. The church was most probably rebuilt at this time. (The extent of rebuilding in the church's relocation should become clearer as the church is opened up for conservation works). The new church building featured six leaded glass windows and many internal memorial plaques. An adjacent residence with Sunday school rooms (the Manse building) was constructed in, or shortly before, 1934 and was dedicated to the United Aborigines Mission (UAM).

The La Perouse Aboriginal Mission later became the United Aborigines Mission (UAM) which was a significant group in the history of the La Perouse Mission Church. Founded by white Protestants and based in Melbourne the UAM was similar to the NSW-based AIM. Both the UAM and the AIM were non-denominational faith missions and local missionary movements dedicated specifically to evangelising among the Aboriginal peoples. While Aboriginal people were a low priority for the major denominations, AIM and UAM together accounted for almost half of all missionaries working with Aboriginal people. They attracted large numbers of women missionaries, who consistently outnumbered the men. By the 1930s, the UAM was laying claim to the La Perouse Mission Church in the plaque erected on the Manse building in 1934. A 1950s UAM publication notes that this church was the mother church of the mission's work across Australia. O'Brien comments that Aboriginal people generally recall AIM and UAM missionaries with affection. This view is fully supported by the La Perouse community.

Missionaries of the 1950s to the 1990s are remembered as being generally married couples with families. Occasionally children of the La Perouse community would live with the missionaries at the mission house (the Manse). The missionaries are recalled with great affection by the current community. There were periods of time when there was no ministers at the church and services were not held. Ministers at La Perouse were non-Indigenous until the later decades when Aboriginal ministers Pastors Benjamin Cruse, Ray Minnicon and Mark Naden served in the 1980s and 1990s. The last missionary at La Perouse was Tom Coe, who left in 1999. The last burial service at the church was in 1986 but baptisms took place at least up until 1988. Services ceased in the 1990s.

Howard and Evelyn Miles were missionaries at La Perouse in the 1960s and 70s. They printed the United Aborigines Mission publications at the Manse in this period. They also brought in Aboriginal missionary women from the Northern Territory (remembered as Dorothy, Marlene and Jessie) to work at La Perouse.

While most of the church's congregation was Aboriginal, non-Aboriginal people did attend church services, particularly post WWII European migrants from the nearby camps (until these were disbanded). The children from the camps and the reserve also mixed at the local public school. The present La Perouse Aboriginal community notes the strong social and spiritual significance of the La Perouse Mission Church to present and past community members. The church provided its community with a strong sense of spirituality, without requiring a connection to organised Christian worship and observance.

Hymn singing was a favourite church activity and singing (either accompanied by the church organ or unaccompanied) was particularly important to the La Perouse church community. Hymn singing took place in people's homes, often while sitting outside on their front steps. Children sang in groups at other churches and when visiting the sick and elderly of the community. Hymn singing was part of the popular culture of the La Perouse community. Some families also learned to play the organ through the church.

The church encouraged adult, child and family involvement. Bible study was for the adults only and took place in people's homes. Adult community members sometimes attended conventions at country-based Aboriginal missions with which La Perouse was linked, such at Wreck Bay on the South Coast, and Purfleet near Taree on the North Coast. Young children attended Sunday School at the Manse. Community members often taught at Sunday School. Children sang in choirs, marched into town with banners and performed Nativity plays and sang Christmas carols. There was a large Women's Group at the church and the Youth Group (called Christian Endeavour) met on Tuesday afternoons after school. Youth activities included cooking sessions at the Manse and dancing for girls and boys. Youth and adult church social activities included dancing, to old time and rock and roll music, at the Blue Hall (now demolished) that was located to the west of the Manse (outside the proposed SHR curtilage). The Blue Hall was also used for children's dance and ballet classes and movie screenings and (from the 1960s) a television was installed. The entry charge for films and TV shows (Bandstand was a favourite) was 6d (6 old pence). The state government ran summer camps for Aboriginal children and young people for two weeks in early January on the flat ground south of the Blue Hall (also outside the proposed SHR curtilage). All these activities took place variously in the 1960s, 70s and 80s.

Present day community members note that attendance at church services and social activities was not something forced on children and young people but was willingly undertaken by community members who participated generally until at least 18 or 19 years of age. It is also noted that church services and church social activities were the only times that Aboriginal children and young people were allowed out in the reserve without being under the watchful eye of their families. This indicates the long-held community fear of children being taken without warning by "the welfare" to become part of the Stolen Generations. The La Perouse Mission Church was regarded by Aboriginal community as a safe haven for its children and as such its activities were well-supported by all ages in the community.

Iris Williams, who lived on the reserve, recalls her mother preaching at the church and giving funeral sermons. Gloria Ardler attended the church on Sundays and other church activities such as Sunday school picnics and parties that were held near the Mission House. She recalls that the organ was played by Mrs Cook and Mrs Foster and that the "little church was always full". Nearly all the reserve population were married at the church, had their babies baptised there and their funeral services held there. But there were periods when no services were held.

== Description ==
A small Gothic, weatherboard, white-painted church. The church was originally built on the beach at Frenchman's Beach in 1894. A surviving published black and white photograph shows this building to have been a simple one-room gabled structure with only one six-paned window in the long side wall. The church was relocated to its present site at the corner of Elaroo Avenue and Adina Avenue, La Perouse in 1929–30 and appears to have been rebuilt (or largely rebuilt) at this time. The extent to which the church was rebuilt in its relocation is likely to be clarified when the building is opened up for conservation works as marks in the timber will be apparent.

The church faces east and has a gabled porch, a bellcote, a nave and six lancet coloured glass windows (three on each side). Several of the window frames and coloured glass panels are broken and some of the glass is lying inside the church. The timber picket fence surrounding the church is likely to be a later replacement. There is a wooden plaque to the AEC Colebrook Memorial Aboriginal Evangelical Church on the exterior wall of the church beside the porch. The interior of the church was inspected and its contents noted in May 2012. There are six rows of timber pews on each side of a centre aisle. The pews are adjustable and are believed to have originally been tram seats. At the altar end, there is a timber pulpit with two adjacent organs, a plaqued timber chair and a stool.

On the wall behind the pulpit there are mounted: a hymn board, a painted scroll, a green blackboard, and a stone plaque. The plaque is inscribed: "Ye serve the Lord Christ Col.3.24. – In Loving Memory of Miss H Baker Missionary at La Perouse who spent her life in loving service among the native people – called home April 1951 – 40 years in the work – to the Glory of God."

The pulpit is plaqued: Presented by Mr C Barton – designed and constructed by Mr Jas. Jago – to the Glory of God. The hymn board is also plaqued. Anecdotal evidence indicates there was no altar nor a font, but that a large bowl of water was brought in for baptisms. The chair behind the pulpit is plaqued: "In loving memory of our dear little son Lyle A Stuart – age 11 months – safe in the arms of God." (date unclear).

All six windows have small metal plaques on the timber sills. Plaques are dedicated as follows:

1. William AB Smith the Boy Preacher – Assisted in the Services at this Mission
2. To the Glory of God and Loving Memory – Richard and Lydia Playford whose love and devotion to the workers and native people as shown by their kindly deeds till called home – Donated by their family
3. This window is a gift – Mrs Anne Baker – in loving memory of her husband Inspector WT Baker – for many years the friend of the Aborigines – To the Glory of God
4. To the Glory of God who made one of all the nations – this window is dedicated to the Memory of Lizzie, Clara and other loyal native Christians who in past years upheld our hands – Donated by Miss Baker
5. This window is dedicated to the memory of George A Corbitt whose love and devotion to the native People was shown in his work among them
6. The plaque on the sixth window was inaccessible and not sited at the May 2012 inspection.

Two sliding frosted glass-panelled doors (which appear to be original) connect the entrance porch to the church nave. Surmounted above the doors inside the church is a wooden boomerang inscribed "United Aborigines Mission" with a metal plaque inscribed: "To the Glory of God – these doors are a special gift in loving memory of my dear husband Thomas E Colebrook late President of this Mission".

At the opposite end to the porch there is a rear door (in the western wall) and a framed poster hangs on the internal southern wall.

There are several items of moveable heritage located in the entrance porch and around the pulpit and two organs. These include hymn books, printed booklets and pages, a timber box of hymn cards and a wooden framed brass plaque inscribed:

Pastor Benjamin Cruse – 84 years – passed into the presence of the Lord on the 4th April 1990 – his dedicated service spanned over 35 years and 17 years pastored the La Perouse Colbrook (sic) Memorial Peoples Church. A respected Aboriginal Christian leader whose life touched so many lives setting the highest role model standards for every level of society in Christian integrity – John 14.1.6.

A bell was run for Sunday services and Sunday School, but this has not been located to date (pers. comm. 'Friends of La Perouse').

The Manse building that adjoins the western side of the church is believed to date from 1934 (soon after the church's relocation). A commemorative plaque on the exterior entrance was of the Manse is inscribed:

'United Aborigines Mission This tablet was laid by Rev EJ Telfer on 20 October 1934 to record God's goodness in providing this mission house and to recall happy memories of Mrs TE Colebrook whose house was always open.'

The mosaic entrance step to the Manse building is inlaid with the initials 'U.A.M.'

The interior of the Manse building was not inspected in May 2012. Community advice is that the building has been extensively modified over time and that there is no surviving fabric to demonstrate the existence of printing activity for the UAM mission publications, including The Messenger newspaper, that were run from the building in the 1960s and 1970s by Howard and Evelyn Miles.

Services to the building have been disconnected and the building has been condemned by Randwick Council. The Manse building is not considered to be of heritage significance, with the exception of the plaque and entrance step. The retention in situ of the exterior wall and plaque and the entrance step and their incorporation into any new re-development is recommended.

On the grassed area south of the church building is a small sandstone outcrop (c. 4 metres (13 ft) by 2.5 metres (8 ft 2 in)) with two pecked and grooved engravings.

1. One engraving is of a large kangaroo measuring a total of two square metres (twenty-two square feet) which appears to be looking over its right shoulder towards the west. The tail is covered by an over-growth of grass.
2. The second engraving is of a human figure of approximately one square metre (eleven square feet) holding a boomerang in his left hand, showing the fingers gripping the boomerang. The human figure is holding a spear in his right hand and looks to be about to throw the spear at the kangaroo. The legs have been overgrown by grass. Anecdotal evidence indicates that the two figures were carved in 1931 by Burt Tambar, Bob Simms and Jack Simms of the La Perouse community, in connection with the opening of the Sydney Harbour Bridge in March 1932.

=== Condition ===
As at 16 July 2012, the building is in poor condition. Some windows and window frames are broken (but much of the original broken glass remains inside the church). The church has not been used since services ceased in the 1990s.

=== Modifications and dates ===
The church was relocated from Frenchman's Beach to its present location in 1929–30 when it is believed it was rebuilt. 1930s inclusions were:

- Six leaded glass windows
- Roof of corrugated asbestos sheeting
- Ceiling of asbestos sheeting
- Internal memorial plaques
- Church furniture
- Adjacent Manse building (used as residence, for Sunday School and for printing the UAM newspaper) was built in, or shortly before, 1934.

=== Further information ===
It is considered that the extent to which the church was rebuilt in the course of its 1929–30 relocation will become apparent from marks in the timber when the church is opened up for conservation works.

== Heritage listing ==
As at 10 July 2012, La Perouse Mission Church is significant in the history of the Aboriginal Christian movement in NSW. It is an important antecedent to the Indigenous Christian organisation that exists today, such as Australian Indigenous Ministries.

As an early church establishment, the La Perouse Mission Church was held to be the mother church of the United Aborigines Mission, from which centre the Mission spread to all parts of Australia.

Within the Aboriginal Christian movement, the La Perouse Church demonstrates the critical and successful role of female missionaries, both Aboriginal and European, in evangelising the Aboriginal people. The church has strong associations with two significant missionary figures of its early period: one European and one Aboriginal. Retta Long, the church's first and highly successful resident missionary, was an important figure of state significance in Aboriginal missionary work who left the La Perouse Mission Church to found one of the largest missionary societies that worked exclusively for the Aboriginal people. "Queen" Emma Timbery, an Aboriginal woman and "matriarch" of the La Perouse community who lived on the reserve, was one of the earliest Aboriginal converts to be involved in mission work. Emma worked and travelled with Retta throughout her period as resident missionary at La Perouse. Emma's evangelical work extended beyond her missionary assistance to include leadership of the La Perouse Aboriginal Christians.

The La Perouse Aboriginal community has exceptional historic significance in the context of Aboriginal survival of European settlement. Some of the Aboriginal community of La Perouse have an unbroken connection to the land for over 7500 years. Members of the Timbery family living in La Perouse today can trace their ancestors back to pre-contact times.

Many current La Perouse residents have strong connections with the Aboriginal community at Wreck Bay on the NSW South Coast. These connections fostered the growth of the La Perouse community in the 1870s when La Perouse became an informal refuge for many from the South Coast who were forced off their lands by the spread of dairy farming.

The church demonstrates the historical significance of the Aboriginal community of La Perouse in the post-contact era as the only community in Sydney that held on to its territory in the face of repeated threats of relocation. The church, located on the Aboriginal reserve, demonstrates the robustness and resilience of the La Perouse Aboriginal community to official threats to the community's existence over time.

Additionally, the church demonstrates the capacity of the La Perouse Aboriginal community to adapt to and establish changed living conditions and relationships with Europeans from a wide variety of backgrounds and ethnicities who populated the La Perouse area during and after the Depression era. Many relationships, partnerships and families grew from the interaction of the Aboriginal and non-Aboriginal communities on the La Perouse reserve and in the Happy Valley, Frog Hollow and Hill 60 camps in the period when the La Perouse Mission Church was still active in worship.

The La Perouse Mission Church has social and spiritual significance to the past, present and dispersed Aboriginal community of La Perouse. For virtually all the 20th century (and earlier) the La Perouse Mission Church was an important spiritual, cultural and social focus of the life of the Aboriginal community of the La Perouse reserve (and later the Local Aboriginal Land Council landholding). Church services and activities were willingly and well-supported by all ages of the community. They are remembered as enriching the life of the community and were seen by the community as a safe and happy environment where its children and young people would be beyond the reach of the government and safe from its policy of Aboriginal child-taking. The missionary leaders are remembered with affection by the present community.

The Aboriginal rock engravings on the site that were created in connection with the opening of the Sydney Harbour Bridge in 1932 are an important demonstration of the continued cultural practice of engraving on sandstone by Aboriginal people. In this instance the engravings also demonstrate Aboriginal engagement with European historical processes and events of state significance.

The La Perouse Mission Church may be a rare example of a surviving early timber missionary church in Sydney or NSW that is still held in high esteem by the local Aboriginal community.

La Perouse Mission Church was listed on the New South Wales State Heritage Register on 15 March 2013 having satisfied the following criteria.

The place is important in demonstrating the course, or pattern, of cultural or natural history in New South Wales.

La Perouse Mission church is very important in the history of the Aboriginal Christian movement in NSW and was an important antecedent to the Indigenous Christian organisation that exist today, such as Australian Indigenous Ministries.

As an early church establishment, the La Perouse Mission Church was held to be the mother church of the United Aborigines Mission, from which centre the Mission spread to all parts of Australia.

Within the Aboriginal Christian movement, the La Perouse Church demonstrates the critical and successful role of female missionaries, both Aboriginal and European, in evangelising the Aboriginal people. Retta Long, the church's first and highly successful resident missionary, was an important figure of state significance in Aboriginal missionary work who left the La Perouse Mission Church to found one of the largest missionary societies working exclusively for the Aboriginal people. "Queen" Emma Timbery, who lived on the La Perouse reserve, was one of the earliest Aboriginal converts involved in mission work. She assisted Retta in her missionary work throughout Retta's period as resident missionary at La Perouse. "Native helpers" came into increasing importance of the following decades and Retta appointed as many women as men to these positions. Emma's evangelical work extended beyond her missionary assistance to Retta to include leadership of the La Perouse Aboriginal Christians.

The La Perouse Aboriginal community has exceptional historic significance in the context of Aboriginal survival of European settlement. Some of the Aboriginal community of La Perouse have an unbroken connection to the land for over 7500 years. Members of the Timbery family living in La Perouse today can trace their ancestors back to pre-contact times.

Many current La Perouse residents have strong connections with the Aboriginal community at Wreck Bay on the NSW South Coast that likely predate the establishment of the reserve at La Perouse. These connections are considered to have fostered the growth of the La Perouse community in the 1870s when it became an informal refuge for many from the South Coast who were forced off their lands by the spread of dairy farming.

The church demonstrates the historical significance of the Aboriginal community of La Perouse in the post-contact era as the only community in Sydney that held on to its territory in the face of repeated threats of relocation away from La Perouse. The church, located on the Aboriginal reserve, demonstrates the robustness and resilience of the La Perouse Aboriginal community to official threats to the community's existence over time.

Additionally, the church demonstrates the capacity of the La Perouse Aboriginal community to adapt to and establish changed living conditions and relationships with Europeans from a wide variety of backgrounds and ethnicities who populated the La Perouse area during and after the Depression era. Many relationships, partnerships and families grew from the interaction of the Aboriginal and non-Aboriginal communities on the La Perouse reserve and in the Happy Valley, Frog Hollow and Hill 60 camps. Following the demise of the camps, new residential communities grew up in La Perouse and Matraville that were serviced by the La Perouse Mission Church.

The Aboriginal rock engravings on the site demonstrate the La Perouse community's engagement with European historical processes (in this case the opening of the Sydney Harbour Bridge).

The place has a strong or special association with a person, or group of persons, of importance of cultural or natural history of New South Wales's history.

La Perouse Mission Church has important associations with two significant missionary women: one Aboriginal and one European.

Margaret Jane (Retta) Long (nee Dixon) (1878–1956) was the first resident missionary La Perouse in the late 1890s. Although aged only 19, Retta was responsible for the evangelising of large numbers of Aboriginal people, not only at the La Perouse Mission but also in the Hawkesbury region, the Macleay River on the North Coast and the South Coast. Out of Retta's work at La Perouse was born the Aborigines Inland Mission (AIM) which became the most successful broad-based Indigenous missionary society in NSW to that time. AIM set up a number of missions in various parts of NSW, beginning with one at Singleton in 1905. She continued to direct AIM until the early 1950s, shortly before her death in 1956. Retta's achievement is all the more remarkable given that both the missions she directed (the NSW Aborigines Mission at La Perouse and AIM, which was state-wide) functioned as "faith" missions from 1902.

'Queen' Emma Timbery (also known as "Granny" Timbery) (1842–1916) was a matriarchal figure in the La Perouse Aboriginal community where she lived form c. 1882 to 1816. Following her conversion to Christianity in the early 1890s, Emma became Vice-President of the La Perouse Aborigines Christian Endeavour Society. From 1897 she worked with Retta Long, the resident missionary at La Perouse. Together the two women travelled and performed missionary work with Aboriginal people throughout NSW. Emma was one of the earliest Aboriginal missionary helpers; a position that grew in importance in later decades.

The place is important in demonstrating aesthetic characteristics and/or a high degree of creative or technical achievement in New South Wales.

The two 1931 Aboriginal rock engravings on the site demonstrate the continued cultural practice of engraving on sandstone. They were produced to mark the opening of the Sydney Harbour Bridge in March 1932 and demonstrate the La Perouse Aboriginal community's engagement with a non-Indigenous event of state significance through the cultural practice of engraving.

The place has a strong or special association with a particular community or cultural group in New South Wales for social, cultural or spiritual reasons.

The La Perouse Mission Church has social and spiritual significance to the past, present and dispersed Aboriginal community of La Perouse. It demonstrates the strength and focus of the community's spiritual connection through the church's services and its cultural and social activities that willingly engaged all ages of the community over along period of time.

For virtually all the 20th century (and earlier) the La Perouse Mission Church was an important spiritual, cultural and social focus of the life of the Aboriginal community of the La Perouse reserve (and later the Local Aboriginal Land Council landholding). Church services and activities are remembered as enriching the life of the community and being willingly and well-supported by all ages of the community. The church and its social activities were seen by the community as a safe and happy environment where its children and young people would be beyond the reach of the government and safe from its policy of Aboriginal child-taking. The missionary leaders are remembered with affection by the present community.

The general La Perouse community and the La Perouse LALC support the listing. Among these supporters many also seek to reopen the church for worship and as a hub for community social activities.

The place has potential to yield information that will contribute to an understanding of the cultural or natural history of New South Wales.

The item is not considered to be significant under this criterion.

The place possesses uncommon, rare or endangered aspects of the cultural or natural history of New South Wales.

La Perouse Mission Church may be a rare surviving example of a timber church built on an Aboriginal reserve specifically for missionary work to the Aboriginal people which continues to be held in high community esteem.

The place is important in demonstrating the principal characteristics of a class of cultural or natural places/environments in New South Wales.

La Perouse Mission Church is a representative example of a common small timber church of the type often found in rural areas but which is relatively rare in Sydney.

== See also ==
- List of Aboriginal peoples of New South Wales
