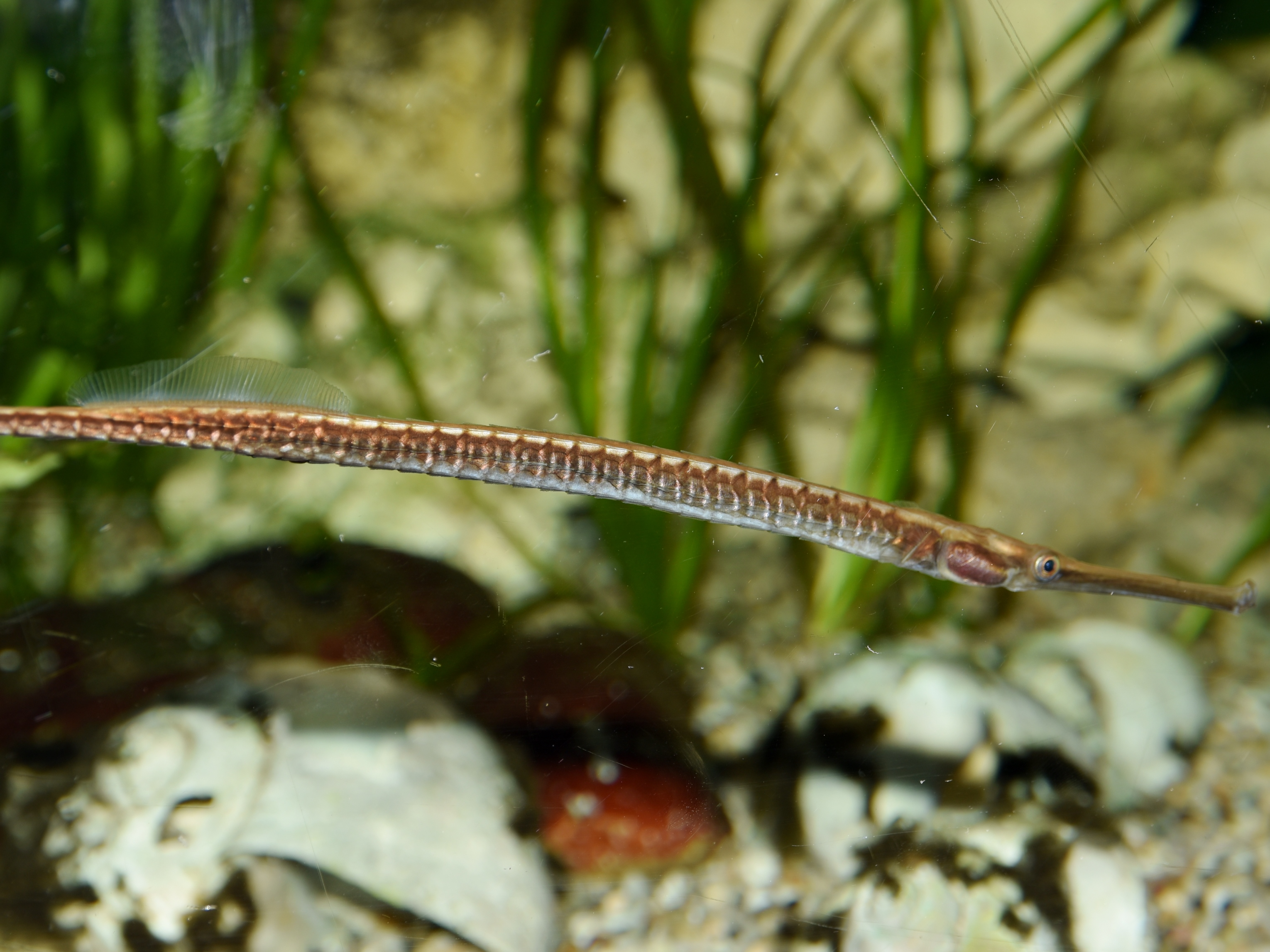

Scientific classification
- Kingdom: Animalia
- Phylum: Chordata
- Class: Actinopterygii
- Order: Syngnathiformes
- Family: Syngnathidae
- Subfamily: Syngnathinae
- Genus: Doryichthys; Kaup, 1853

Type species
- Doryichthys bilinearus Kaup, 1856

Synonyms
- Doryrhamphinarum Kaup, 1856; Kaupia J. L. B. Smith, 1963

= Doryichthys =

Genus of fishes

Doryichthys, river pipefish, is a genus of Asian freshwater pipefishes.

== Etymology ==
Their name is derived from the Greek dory meaning "lance" and ichthys meaning fish.

== Species ==
There are currently five recognized species in this genus:

- Doryichthys boaja (Bleeker, 1850) (Asian river pipefish)
- Doryichthys contiguus Kottelat, 2000
- Doryichthys deokhatoides (Bleeker, 1854) (Large-spots river pipefish)
- Doryichthys heterosoma (Bleeker, 1851) (Sambas river pipefish)
- Doryichthys martensii (W. K. H. Peters, 1868) (Martens' pipefish)
