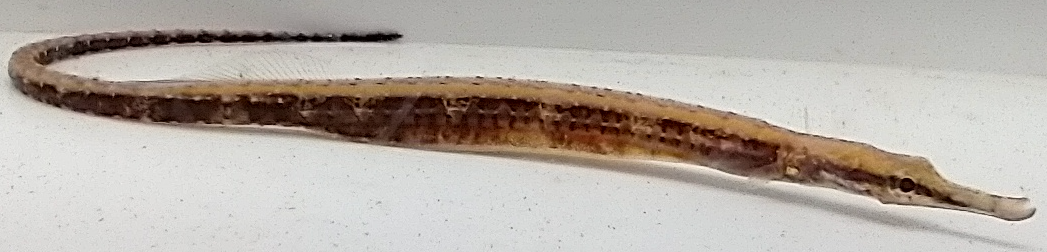

Conservation status
- Data Deficient (IUCN 3.1)

Scientific classification
- Kingdom: Animalia
- Phylum: Chordata
- Class: Actinopterygii
- Order: Syngnathiformes
- Family: Syngnathidae
- Genus: Doryichthys
- Species: D. martensii

Binomial name
- Doryichthys martensii Peters, 1868

Synonyms
- Doryichthys brachyrhynchops Fowler, 1934; Microphis ignoratus Vaillant, 1902; Syngnathus martensii Peters, 1868

= Doryichthys martensii =

Longsnouted pipefish

Species of fish

Doryichthys martensii (longsnouted pipefish) is a species of freshwater, benthopelagic, fish of the family Syngnathidae. It is found in Indonesia, Malaysia, Brunei Darussalam, and Thailand. It lives in rivers and streams, where it is reported to feed on mosquito larvae and grow to a max length of 15 centimetres (5.9 in). This species is ovoviviparous, with males carrying eggs and giving birth to live young. Males may brood at 10.4 centimetres (4.1 in).
