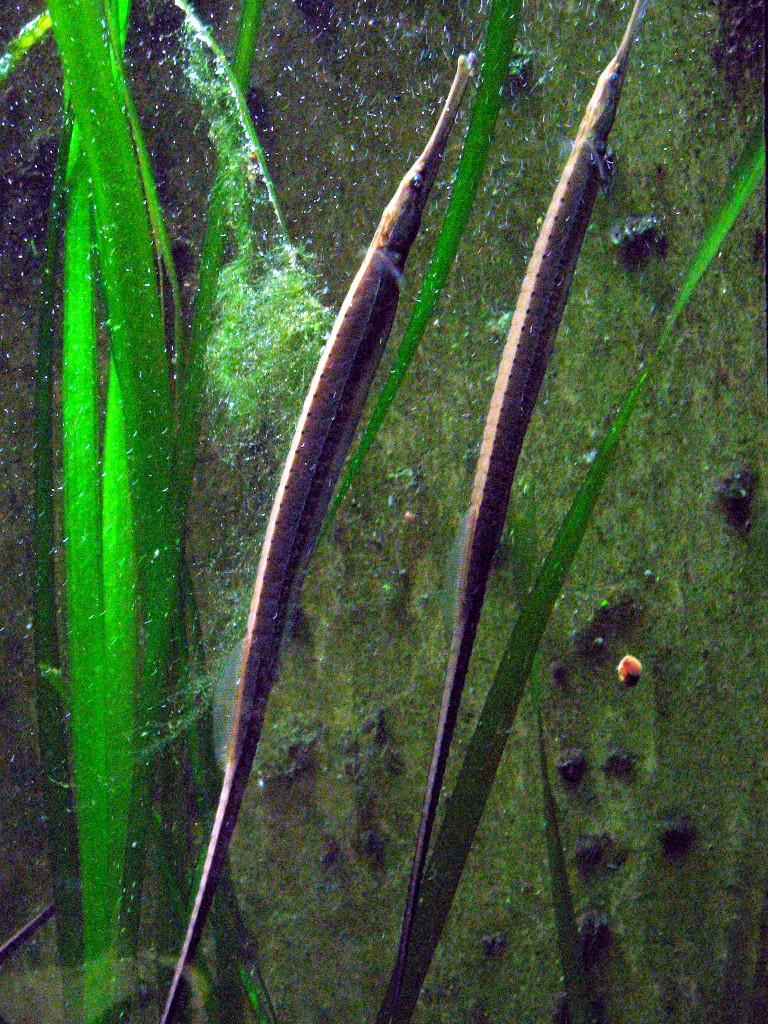

Conservation status
- Data Deficient (IUCN 3.1)

Scientific classification
- Kingdom: Animalia
- Phylum: Chordata
- Class: Actinopterygii
- Order: Syngnathiformes
- Family: Syngnathidae
- Genus: Doryichthys
- Species: D. boaja

Binomial name
- Doryichthys boaja (Bleeker, 1850)

Synonyms
- Doryichthys spinosus Kaup, 1856; Microphis boaja (Bleeker, 1850); Syngnathus boaja Bleeker, 1850; Syngnathus jullieni Sauvage, 1874; Syngnathus zonatus Károli, 1882

= Doryichthys boaja =

Species of fish

Doryichthys boaja, the long-snouted pipefish, is a species of freshwater fish of the family Syngnathidae. It is widely distributed in Southeast Asia, found in Indonesia, Malaysia, Thailand, Cambodia and Vietnam. It lives in streams and rivers, where it feeds on small crustaceans, worms and insects. It can grow to a maximum length of 41 cm, making it the largest recorded freshwater pipefish. This species is ovoviviparous, with the male carrying eggs before giving birth to live young.

== Identifying features ==
Doryichthys boaja can be identified by its conspicuous color pattern of alternating blue and brown bars along the trunk and tail.
