= Chinese Market Gardens (La Perouse) =

- Location within Sydney Location within Australia
- 33°58′33″S 151°14′02″E
- Location: 1–39 Bunnerong Road, La Perouse, City of Randwick, New South Wales, Australia

Site notes
- Owner: NSW Department of Industry

New South Wales Heritage Register
- Official name: Chinese Market Gardens; Chinese Gardens La Perouse; Phillip Bay; Matraville; Randwick
- Type: State heritage (landscape)
- Designated: 13 August 1999
- Reference no.: 1299
- Type: Market Garden
- Category: Farming and Grazing

The Chinese Market Gardens is a heritage-listed market gardens at 1–39 Bunnerong Road, La Perouse, New South Wales, a suburb of Sydney, Australia. It is also known as Chinese Gardens La Perouse, Phillip Bay, Matraville and Randwick. The property is Crown land and is owned by NSW Department of Industry, a department of the Government of New South Wales. It was added to the New South Wales State Heritage Register on 13 August 1999.

== History ==
=== Indigenous history ===
Pre-1780s the local Aboriginal people in the area used the site for fishing and cultural activities – rock engravings, grinding grooves and middens remain in evidence. In 1789 Governor Arthur Phillip referred to "a long bay", which became known as Long Bay. Aboriginal people are believed to have inhabited the Sydney region for at least 20,000 years. The population of Aboriginal people between Palm Beach and Botany Bay in 1788 has been estimated to have been 1500. Those living south of Port Jackson to Botany Bay were the Cadigal people who spoke Dharug, while the local clan name of Maroubra people was "Muru-ora-dial". By the mid nineteenth century the traditional owners of this land had typically either moved inland in search of food and shelter, or had died as the result of European disease or confrontation with British colonisers.

=== Colonial history ===
One of the earliest land grants in this area was made in 1824 to Captain Francis Marsh, who received 4.9 hectares (12 acres) bounded by the present Botany and High Streets, Alison and Belmore Roads. In 1839 William Newcombe acquired the land north-west of the present town hall in Avoca Street.

Randwick takes its name from the town of Randwick, Gloucestershire, England. The name was suggested by Simeon Pearce (1821–86) and his brother James. Simeon was born in the English Randwick and the brothers were responsible for the early development of both Randwick and its neighbour, Coogee. Simeon had come to the colony in 1841as a 21 year old surveyor. He built his Blenheim House on the 4 acres he bought from Marsh, and called his property "Randwick". The brothers bought and sold land profitably in the area and elsewhere. Simeon campaigned for construction of a road from the city to Coogee (achieved in 1853) and promoted the incorporation of the suburb. Pearce sought construction of a church modelled on the church of St. John in his birthplace. In 1857 the first St Jude's stood on the site of the present post office, at the corner of the present Alison Road and Avoca Street.

Randwick was slow to progress. The village was isolated from Sydney by swamps and sandhills, and although a horse-drawn omnibus was operated by a man named Grice from the late 1850s, the journey was more a test of nerves than a pleasure jaunt. Wind blew sand over the track, and the bus sometimes became bogged, so that passengers had to get out and push it free. From its early days Randwick had a divided society. The wealthy lived elegantly in large houses built when Pearce promoted Randwick and Coogee as a fashionable area. But the market gardens, orchards and piggeries that continued alongside the large estates were the lot of the working class. Even on the later estates that became racing empires, many jockeys and stablehands lived in huts or even under canvas. An even poorer group were the immigrants who existed on the periphery of Randwick in a place called Irishtown, in the area now known as The Spot, around the junction of St.Paul's Street and Perouse Road. Here families lived in makeshift houses, taking on the most menial tasks in their struggle to survive.

In 1858 when the NSW Government passed the Municipalities Act, enabling formation of municipal districts empowered to collect rates and borrow money to improve their suburb, Randwick was the first suburb to apply for the status of a municipality. It was approved in February 1859, and its first Council was elected in March 1859.

Randwick had been the venue for sporting events, as well as duels and illegal sports, from the early days in the colony's history. Its first racecourse, the Sandy Racecourse or Old Sand Track, had been a hazardous track over hills and gullies since 1860. When a move was made in 1863 by John Tait, to establish Randwick Racecourse, Simeon Pearce was furious, especially when he heard that Tait also intended to move into Byron Lodge. Tait's venture prospered, however and he became the first person in Australia to organise racing as a commercial sport. The racecourse made a big difference to the progress of Randwick. The horse-drawn omnibus gave way to trams that linked the suburb to Sydney and civilisation. Randwick soon became a prosperous and lively place, and it still retains a busy residential, professional and commercial life.

Today, some of the houses have been replaced by home units. Many European migrants reside in the area, along with students and workers from the nearby University of NSW and the Prince of Wales Hospital.

==== Timeline ====
- 1882: The government reserved from sale 200 acres of land at Bumbora Point, Yarra Bay.
- 1888: Botany cemetery gazetted, 29 acres, 2 rods, 27 perches.
- 1893: First interment, Botany Cemetery.
- 1901: Bunnerong Cemetery gazetted, 25 acres.
- 1902: James Thomas Smith granted special lease of 15 acres for market garden and poultry farm.
- 1904: William Foster Anderson granted 10 acres for a market garden – portion 1077. Catherine King granted a lease of 7 acres 3 roods 34 perches for a poultry farm on portion 1079. [On portion 1061 which adjoined 1079 the lessee is George Soo Hoo]
- 1905: Parish map shows the market gardens. James Hancock granted lease of 10 acres for market garden - portion 1076. Samuel Hancock granted a lease of 10 acres for a market garden – portion 1078.
- 1906: James Hancock expands taking over the lease of portion 1077 from Anderson. Lives on the property. Applies unsuccessfully for freehold over 1076 and 1077. The two portions are eventually combined into Lot 1077.
- 1909: James Hancock sublets 4 acres to Ah Choon who leases on to Ah Fook, Gee Hoi and three other Chinese.
- 1910: James Hancock applies unsuccessfully for conditional purchase of 1076 & 1077.
- 1913: Kate King leases Lot 1079 to James King.
- 1916: [Which?] Hancock's land subleased to Chinese gardeners.
- 1917: Samuel Hancock is refused conditional purchase of 1078.
- 1920: James King sub-lets portion 1079.
- 1920: Samuel Hancock's lease on Lot 1078 is extended 14 years.
- 1921: Catherine King resumes lease of portion 1079.
- 1922: Special lease for 7 acres 3 roods 34 perches granted to Kate King for a Poultry Farm, Vegetable Garden, Business Purposes (greengrocer) and Residence, with tenure extending until 1934 at least.
- 1923: James Hancock sublets Lot 1076 to See Lee & Co. Samuel Hancock sublets 5 acres on Lot 1078 to Hong Chung.
- 1924: James Hancock sublets Lot 1077 to Tiy War & Co.
- 1927: Seven Chinese living on portion 1076.
- 1932: Leases over portions 1076 and 1077 (not Lot 1077) are renewed to James Hancock.
- 1933: Lease to Samual Hancock on Lot 1078 is revoked. Tiy War & Co applies successfully for lease of 8 acres 21 perches on Lot 1078, however this area was progressively reduced to 5 acres 9 perches by 1951.
- 1939: Kat King's tenure on portion 1079 expires.
- 1941: Special lease granted to Sun Lee for 4 acres 3 roods 16 perches in Portion 1079, expiring 1948. A special lease to Henry Chan Lum also in this portion expired in 1966.
- 1954: Part of the land in portions 1077 and 1078 were taken for the survey of Allotment 29, Botany Cemetery.
- 1957: Tiy War & Co leases 4 acres 19 perches on Lot 1078 until 1966.
- 1968: From this time Bing Sun Ng and Lo Wun Leong were farming on portion 1079.

Notes:

1. Entries linked to expansion of the cemetery into the market garden land marked *
2. This time line covers only the gardens on the western side of Bunnerong Road. Until the 1980s the gardens continued along the line of drainage on the eastern side of the road as well, and both sides were the subject of early attempts to list the gardens in 1979.

=== Aboriginal land ===
Aboriginal people are believed to have inhabited the Sydney region for at least 20,000 years. The population of Aboriginal people in the Sydney area was estimated by the First Fleet's Governor Phillip as being around 1500. The traditional owners of the land near La Perouse were the Kameygal, and their proximity to the coast meant that they enjoyed a plentiful supply of fish. The area also had fresh water supplies and places of natural shelter. Rock engravings, grinding grooves and middens remain in the locality in evidence of their occupation. By the mid nineteenth century most Aboriginal people had either died as the result of European disease or confrontation with British colonisers or moved away in search of food and shelter. However, later in the 19th century Aboriginal people began moving back to this area, settling in La Perouse where there is still a considerable community, many having strong connections with the Aboriginal community at Wreck Bay near Nowra on the NSW South Coast. From the early 20th century at least La Perouse became a tourist site for Sydneysiders where Aboriginal residents sold souvenirs such as boomerangs and "snake men" entertained spectators. In 1984 an Aboriginal land claim for the Aboriginal Reserve near the bay was successful. More recently an Aboriginal land claim was made successfully on the sandy knoll adjoining the market gardens site known as Hill 60. In 2012 there is also an undecided Aboriginal land claim on the Chinese Market Gardens' three lots.

=== Colonial beginnings ===
When British colonisation of Australia as a penal colony began in 1788 the First Fleet initially landed at Yarra Bay, 300 meters from the Chinese Market Gardens La Perouse, where its creek empties into Botany Bay. Governor Phillip quickly deemed the area unsuitable for settlement as too exposed and swampy with not enough fresh water. Within days the penal settlement had moved a few kilometres north to Port Jackson and found "a proper situation" at Sydney Cove.

Sailing out of Botany Bay, the authorities on the First Fleet were probably alarmed to see two French ships entering the bay. This was a strangely coincidental meeting of the first two European expeditions to the east coast of Australia since Captain Cook's historic "discovery" in 1770. Captain of the French expedition, La Vicompte de La Perouse was on a scientific tour of the world, probably with imperialist underpinnings, and sought to replenish his supplies and rest his crew. They landed at a small bay next to Yarra Bay, now known as 'Frenchman's Bay' where they set up a stockade and planted European vegetable seeds in a plot that became known as 'the Frenchman's Gardens', probably intended to feed the crew on the return trip home. After setting sail in March 1788 La Perouse was never seen again (by Europeans) and the ruins of his ships were only discovered decades later, off the coast of what is now Vanuatu (Dictionary of Sydney 'La Perouse').

Local historian Greg Blaxland has suggested that the Chinese Market Gardens La Perouse may have been established in the same place as La Perouse's vegetable garden of 1788, making it possibly the first site of European food cultivation in Australia. However Ivan Barko's study of the location of "The French Garden at La Perouse" demonstrates that while the location of the Frenchman's Gardens remains uncertain, it is almost certainly not the site of the Chinese Market Gardens. For example, he quotes from the writings of Victor Lottin, a Frenchman who visited in 1824, which states that La Perouse's plot was "located at 300 paces" distance from the tower'. Around 1822 the British had built a watchtower on a high point south of La Perouse's stockade and stationed troops there to keep watch for smugglers. This tower still stands (Dictionary of Sydney 'La Perouse') and is located about 2 km from the closest edge of the Chinese Market Gardens. Nonetheless the close proximity of the Frenchman's Gardens to the Chinese Market Gardens does add to their significance as a historic locality of food cultivation in NSW.

The township of La Perouse is 14 kilometres (8.7 mi) south of the Sydney central business district but was only connected to the city by road in 1869 and then by tram in 1902. The first telegraph cable between Australia and New Zealand was built at La Perouse in 1876.

=== Market Gardens in Randwick ===
The first farms in the La Perouse area were recorded in 1830 on land granted to John Brown on the shores of Botany Bay. His land grant was adjacent to the creek and north west of the subject gardens,. There he built Bunnerong House, the first private dwelling in Randwick municipality, and which was surrounded by orchards – making it another historic site of food cultivation in this locality. "Boonerong" is an Aboriginal word meaning "small creek" according to an 1831 letter from Brown to the Colonial Secretary.

Later 19th century maps show numerous market gardens dotted throughout the municipality although Shirley Fitzgerald states that examination of relevant maps demonstrates that the Chinese Market Gardens La Perouse site was not used for market gardening before 1904 (2012). According to Randwick – A Social History (1985), the market gardens in the south of the municipality in the vicinity of the Chinese Market Gardens, were established to capitalise on the fertile soil and abundant water from the swampy Botany Bay hinterland, that at one time vegetables were among the chief products of the locality. The Perumal Murphy heritage study of Randwick (1989) states that Chinese people were farming the market gardens at La Perouse from 1860 in the wake of the gold rushes. However Paul Rappoport's research into the history of lessees of the three lots at the Chinese Market Gardens La Perouse suggests that the first formal sub-leases made to people with Chinese names dates only from 1909 (2008). A search of Sands Directories indicates that the first record of people with Chinese names living in the Bunnerong Road site date from the late 1920s.

Randwick – A Social History (1985) suggests that before the 1860s, market gardens in the locality were owned and tended by Europeans, some being attached to the wealthiest homes in Randwick. However, by the 1860s many Chinese were coming into the area and working market gardens. Chinese people were discriminated against in NSW during the nineteenth century and early twentieth centuries, and after the gold rush market gardening was one of the few occupations open to them. As Daphne Lowe Kelley of the Chinese Heritage Association of Australia submitted:

In the 19th and 20th centuries when faced with discriminatory attitudes and legislation, combined with restrictive laws, many of the early Chinese turned to market gardening for a living, growing vegetables for the Australian market. As well as market gardening, many Chinese were also employed in the wholesale and retail marketing of fruit and vegetables. Market gardening features as an occupation in the majority of Chinese Australian families whose forebears settled in Australia in the second half of the 19th century and first half of the 20th century.

Members of the Australian Chinese community have worked the Chinese Market Gardens La Perouse for over a century, often passing control of it from one generation to another, or from one family to another. Many Chinese immigrants started their work life in Australia by working in market gardens such as these and then developed related business such as restaurants, food manufacture and the export of food. Sometimes market gardening was not a stand-alone enterprise but had connections with Dixon Street businesses (at the centre of Sydney's Chinatown) which in turn had connections with businesses in Hong Kong or China. Acquiring a lease apparently allowed a certain number of workers to come in. The more workers a company had, the easier it was to deploy them across the state to work in rural stores and gardens or at the markets within a network of businesses owned by the same Chinese businessmen. Market gardens were also sometimes used as a cover for illegal immigrants (e.g. "Man deported to Red China after 8 years in Australia", The Sydney Morning Herald. 14 April 1962. – he had worked on a market garden 'in Matraville'). Thus running a garden was one way of introducing an increased number of workers under the restrictive immigration laws. This is possibly the reason for Tiy War and Co leasing one of the lots at the Chinese Market Gardens at La Perouse from the 1920s. Throughout the twentieth century market gardens helped numerous Chinese immigrants to survive and become established in Australia.

Randwick – A Social History suggests that the men who worked on the gardens were paid low wages although given board and food. The vegetables were washed in a large central shed, and the men sometimes lived in corrugated iron huts on site, cooking over open fires. They were often up by 4am, off with their vegetables to market. Some also hawked the vegetables on Sydney streets or sold them door-to door. The Chinese gardeners were respected in the area and the image of an "Old Chow" (as the gardeners were called) was a vivid one for many older residents. The market gardens continued to be cultivated throughout the twentieth century, many coming under the control of wealthy Chinese merchants in Dixon and Hay Streets, thus being linked into the wider network of Chinese economic activity in NSW.

Most of the market gardens in the north of the Randwick municipality were overtaken by housing by the late nineteenth century, but several of the market gardens in the south near La Perouse survived into more recent times, probably because of their relative isolation and low-lying terrain. By 1961, there were just nine market garden Crown Land leases left in the Randwick municipality, confined to two areas: four in the Wassell Street area and five in the Bunnerong Road area. Now there are just three left on the Bunnerong Road site. During the 1960s Randwick Council made considerable efforts to prevent long-term extensions of these leases by the Crown in order to facilitate the future use of these areas for residential purposes such a public housing.

Musecape wrote of the La Perouse cultural landscape in 1997: The relative isolation of La Perouse, at the southern end of Sydney's Eastern Suburbs has led to the general area being regarded as one of quarantine – a suitable location for the isolation of society's outcasts: Aboriginal people (at La Perouse), those suffering from infectious diseases (at Prince Henry Hospital), criminals (at Long Bay), the aged (at Bare Island and the Cable Station), the unemployed during the Great Depressions of the 1930s and migrants in the years after World War II. La Perouse accordingly has high levels of social significance as a reminder of past attitudes to disadvantaged groups in the community.

[History of interactions with La Perouse Aboriginal community and Hill 60 shanty town to be expanded].

=== Present situation ===
In 2010 the three lots that make up the Chinese Markets Gardens La Perouse had been under continuous cultivation by the same three Chinese families for between 35 and 60 years. However, in 2011 the family elder who farmed Lot 1079 retired and Crown Lands have not advertised for new lessees. Thus in 2012 this lot lies fallow and overgrown. In 2012 the other two lots continue to be cultivated by the Teng and Ha families.

With the increase in Asian immigrants since 1990, new vegetables have been introduced to the mainstream Australian diet. "When my Dad started on the farm 40 years ago, they grew mostly Australian vegetables such as celery" said Gordon Ha. "Now with the demand for new vegetables, we are growing Chinese vegetables like Bok Choy, Cho(y) Sum and Chinese broccoli".

To be completed. Shirley Fitzgerald's commissioned review 2012 states: These notes should explore the nature of the terrain (swampy, rocky, distant) and place the longevity of the survival of the market gardens in this context. This section should also recognise the role of these gardens within the overall colonial pattern and distribution of horticulture and with reference to its distribution across the urban area of Sydney. Market gardens were not ex-urban or semi-urban land uses, but integral to the urbanisation process. This was well understood in the 19th century when market gardens were ubiquitous throughout Sydney. Subsequent understanding of market gardening as an urban fringe land use, based on calculations of urban land values became the normal way of theorising them as the 20th century progressed. Increasingly the land use was pushed to the urban fringes until today they are located on primarily in the southwest and north-west of the greater metropolitan area. Currently there is a new paradigm emerging that posits an urban model in which horticulture, gardening and even agriculture are once again becoming integral to the urban condition. This section should also contain something on La Perouse as a microcosm of continuous and sequential land occupation patterns from a pre-colonial Indigenous presence to industrial activities are legible in the landscape. In addition the Heritage Branch suggests that parallel with a rise of "Farmers Markets", community garden creation and a thirst for "local" food, knowledge about vegetable and fruit gardening, there is a growing interest in reducing "food miles" and having locally-grown food, sourced from as close to the end-market as possible. Existing market gardens complement this trend, and could be expected to have high social value to the current community.

== Description ==
The Chinese Market Gardens La Perouse are located between the cemetery and the school on Bunnerong Road, La Perouse. The site is bounded to the north by the Eastern Suburbs Memorial Park (including Botany Cemetery, Crematorium, Memorial and Funeral Home), to the south by Hill 60, to the east by Bunnerong Road and to the west by Bicentennial Park. The three lots comprise an area of around seven hectares (seventeen acres). Entrance to Lot 1077 is on Bunnerong Road and the entrances to Lots 1078 and 1079 are through the cemetery (which is also owned by Crown Lands). The site is on low-lying land, growing many kinds of vegetables and herbs, including bok choy, shallots, parsley and coriander. The gardens are equipped with a pipe irrigation system. An unnamed creek flows in the middle of the gardens and has been used for irrigation. Another unnamed creek flows between the market gardens and Botany Cemetery. The two creeks meet at the west end of Lot 1079 then flow to Yarra Bay in Botany Bay through a concrete tunnel. They are liable to flood in heavy rain. In each market garden, there is a group of corrugated iron or fibro buildings. The vegetables are washed in a large central shed, and some workers have been seen to be living in the huts. Other sheds are used as storerooms for agricultural machinery, fertilizer and tools.

=== Condition ===
As at 19 July 2012, two of the three lots continue to be leased by Chinese families and in these the market gardens function well, providing fresh vegetables on daily basis. The lease for the third lot 1079 nearest Botany Bay lapsed in 2011 when the lessee retired and no new lease has been advertised or appointed. In 2012 it is lying fallow and overgrown. Typically the market gardens suffer damage from hailstorms and flood each year. The physical conditions of the buildings are poor. The buildings on Lot 1079 were damaged in 2012.

Traditional cultivation practices appear to have endured and much of the original form of the gardens retained. In 2012 the lease for the third lot 1079 nearest Botany Bay lapsed in 2011 when the lessee retired and now lies fallow and overgrown. The other two lots continue to be leased by Chinese families and in these the market gardens function well, providing fresh vegetables on daily basis.

The creek between the market gardens and Botany Cemetery is not always well maintained and the tunnel leading to Yarra Bay is not capable of draining it in heavy rain. Then water pours over the bank and washes vegetables away, leaving rubbish on the site. Sometimes, the sea water pours back to the market garden through the tunnel.

== Heritage listing ==
As at 19 July 2012, the Chinese Market Gardens La Perouse are of State significance for their history, associations, research potential, representative value and rarity as a site of the continuous cultivation of food for the Sydney metropolitan area by Chinese market gardeners at least since 1909. Traditional cultivation practices appear to have endured and much of the original form of the gardens retained. Offering a living demonstration of one of the few occupations available to Chinese men in the nineteenth century and during the discriminatory period of the White Australia Policy (between Federation and the 1970s) the gardens are significant for their association with the history of Chinese immigration to Australia and the influence of ethnic communities on local industry. The Chinese Market Gardens are also significant because of historic inter-relations between the Chinese market gardeners and the La Perouse Aboriginal community and the depression era camps at Hill 60, contributing unique insights into the history of marginalised people in Sydney. The Chinese Market Gardens La Perouse are also of State social significance for the esteem with which they are held by the Chinese community in NSW.

The gardens are also at least of local significance to the wider community for the role they have played in helping to feed the local and regional population. Although this was particularly valued during the inter-war depression and post-war periods, there has also been a recent growth of interest in sustainable urban agriculture and the value of "local" food, which adds to the esteem in which they are held. They are also of local aesthetic significance for providing the sight of green, productive open space tended by Asian people within a Sydney suburban landscape. Described as "an interesting and charming contrast to its surroundings", the gardens bestow a rural ambience through the pleasing form and strong geometric patterns of their cultivated garden beds, the arrangement of their irrigation channels and creeks, their uncluttered views to adjacent open space and their remnant corrugated iron sheds scattered throughout the site.

See Reference list for hyperlink to Shirley Fitzgerald's report commissioned by the Heritage Branch in 2012 affirming the State significance of this site.

Chinese Market Gardens was listed on the New South Wales State Heritage Register on 13 August 1999 having satisfied the following criteria.

The place is important in demonstrating the course, or pattern, of cultural or natural history in New South Wales.

The Chinese Market Gardens La Perouse are of State historical significance as a site of the continuous cultivation of food for the Sydney metropolitan area by Chinese market gardeners at least since 1909. Traditional cultivation practices appear to have endured and much of the original form of the gardens retained. Offering a living demonstration of one of the few occupations available to Chinese men in the nineteenth century and during the discriminatory period of the White Australia Policy (between Federation and the 1970s) the gardens are significant for their association with the history of Chinese immigration to Australia and the influence of ethnic communities on local industry.

The site is made more significant as an historic place for growing food by its close proximity (within 2 kilometres) to one of the earliest sites of European food cultivation in Australia – by the French explorer La Perouse who in 1788 planted and briefly tended the 'Frenchmen's Gardens' nearby in Frenchman's Bay. The Chinese Market Gardens are also made more significant because of historic inter-relations between the Chinese market gardeners and the La Perouse Aboriginal community. These connections arose partly through proximity, with the gardens being adjacent to the Aboriginal-owned "Hill 60" and close to the La Perouse Aboriginal "Reserve", and partly through shared historic marginalisation from mainstream Australian culture. As Janice Wilton has observed, the "ambiguous position Chinese market gardeners held in local communities" can be seen to be symbolised by the location of their gardens on the edges of towns – "placed on the periphery of white settlement and of European social and working life". The La Perouse gardens demonstrate this aspect of Australian history in their location which in 1900 was remote from the city centre, and in their historic connections to Sydney's indigenous population and to the unemployed who lived in the adjacent shanty town located on Hill 60 during the 1930s depression and afterwards. Thus the history and location of these gardens contributes unique insights into the history of marginalised people in Sydney. Within the statewide story these gardens contribute to our understanding of Chinese settlement patterns and Chinese cultural practices in the period of dwindling Chinese population following the introduction of the White Australia policy in 1901.

The area from Botany Road to the coast and from Matraville south to La Perouse has a long association with the "outsider" elements of European society dating from the late nineteenth century, with land uses that included the Indigenous settlement at La Perouse, the jail at Long Bay, the Coast (infectious diseases) Hospital at Little Bay and a leprosarium. The area hosted the unemployed in makeshift camps during the Great Depression and welcomed the Chinese who were engaged in the peripheral urban occupations of fishing and gardening. Today the intensity of Chinese occupation has all but disappeared, but the remaining market gardens, along with the remnant cemetery once attached to the infectious diseases hospital where many Chinese who contracted smallpox in the 1880s were buried (because their bones were prohibited from being repatriated to China by law), and the vibrant and active temple in Retreat Street, Alexandria (built by the clan associations of the market gardening fraternity) all work together to create a legible imprint of Australia's oldest Chinese community in the landscape.

The place has a strong or special association with a person, or group of persons, of importance of cultural or natural history of New South Wales's history.

The Chinese Market Gardens are of State significance for their associations with Sydney's Chinese community. Long established Chinese organisations have looked after the market gardeners with financial assistance, accommodation and other social welfare. Harry Ha of Tiy War & Co (named as sub-lessor of Portion 1077 as early as 1922) was a principal in the Yiu Ming Tong, the association that ran the Chinese temple at Alexandria, and President of the Gardeners Association. The temple retains records of his involvement in the Go Yiu community to which most market gardeners belonged, and which was involved in repatriation of bones to China. Further research may demonstrate local significance associated with some of the gardens' European operators.

The place is important in demonstrating aesthetic characteristics and/or a high degree of creative or technical achievement in New South Wales.

The Chinese Market Gardens La Perouse are of local aesthetic significance for providing the sight of green, productive open space tended by Asian people within a Sydney suburban landscape. Described as "an interesting and charming contrast to its surroundings", the gardens bestow a rural ambience through their pleasing form and strong geometric patterns of the cultivated garden beds, their arrangement of the irrigation channels and the creek, their uncluttered views to adjacent open space and their remnant corrugated iron sheds scattered throughout the site.

The place has a strong or special association with a particular community or cultural group in New South Wales for social, cultural or spiritual reasons.

The Chinese Market Gardens La Perouse are of State social significance for the esteem with which they are held by the Chinese community in NSW. For many people, especially those from the Yiu Ming district of Guandong, working in market gardens was their starting point in Australia. They worked hard and then moved on to open restaurants, grocery shops and their own businesses. The State Heritage Register listing of the Chinese Market Gardens La Perouse was one of several listings resulting from a 1999 Heritage Branch program which consulted with the Chinese community to nominate sites they considered to be of heritage significance. Submissions in 2012 from representatives of the Chinese Heritage Association of Australia and the Chinese Australian Historical Society suggested that the Chinese Market Gardens La Perouse are considered to be gaining in significance as their rarity within the Sydney metropolitan area increases.

The gardens are of at least local significance to the wider community for the role they have played in helping to feed the local and regional population. Although this was particularly valued during the inter-war depression and post-war periods, there has also been a recent growth of interest in sustainable urban agriculture and the value of "local" food, demonstrated by the rise of community garden creation, "Farmers" Markets' and courses in learning skills required to grow local food. As early as 1979, Randwick residents, in the name of the Perouse Citizens' Advancement Committee, launched a campaign to oppose residential redevelopment and require the State government to conserve the Chinese Market Gardens La Perouse in their historic usage. Their submission included a petition with over a thousand signatures. A more recent petition, organised in 2012 by an official of the Chinese Australian Historical Society, gathered 783 signatures in support of the conservation of the gardens, demonstrating that these market gardens have a long and continuing social significance for the wider community.

The place has potential to yield information that will contribute to an understanding of the cultural or natural history of New South Wales.

The Chinese Market Gardens La Perouse are of State heritage significance for their research potential to illuminate our understandings of Chinese agricultural practices as they have been imported and applied in NSW. In 1999 the work done in the gardens was still by manual labour with simple tools, with just one tractor and one rotary hoe used in each lot. The technical significance of agricultural technology and associated social relations in these market gardens remains to be determined by further detailed research, especially of the extant building structures on the site.

There is also archaeological potential to learn about traditional Aboriginal cultural use of the land before colonisation and its transformation from Indigenous occupation to a place adapted to provide food for the European colony. Filling of the swamp may have served to protect pre-contact archaeological remains. There may also be remnants of activity associated with the mid twentieth century depression camp on the adjacent Hill 60.

The place possesses uncommon, rare or endangered aspects of the cultural or natural history of New South Wales.

The Chinese Market Gardens La Perouse are of State significance for their rarity in demonstrating a continuous pattern of usage of cultivation by Chinese market gardeners from the early twentieth century through to the present. Whereas market gardens were found in every settled locality in NSW throughout the 19th century, since World War II they have been gradually edged out of the metropolitan area. In 2009 a comparative study found that the Chinese Market Gardens La Perouse were one of just five market gardens left in Sydney (the others were Occupation Road Market Gardens (Rockdale LGA), West Botany Street Market Gardens (Rockdale LGA), Toomevara Lane Market Gardens (Rockdale LGA) and Wassell Street Market Gardens (Randwick LGA), according to Rappoport, 2009). At a local level the site is rare as one of just two traditional market gardens remaining in the Randwick LGA.

By the 1950s the numbers of resident Chinese in NSW had dwindled to the point where many of the gardens were being taken over by southern European immigrants, typically the Italians and Maltese. The end of the White Australia policy in the 1970s and the increase in Asian migration since then has seen the re-entry of Asians into the occupation. The continuous occupation of the leasehold by Chinese lessees at these gardens is particularly rare in this context.

The place is important in demonstrating the principal characteristics of a class of cultural or natural places/environments in New South Wales.

The Chinese Market Gardens La Perouse are of State significance as a fine representative example of market gardens in NSW which have remained largely intact over time. Early colonial efforts at supplying food to the Sydney settlement included tillage at Farm Cove, in Woolloomooloo, at the head of Darling Harbour and near the present Central Station, while parts of Chippendale were given over to potatoes and hosted the colony's first nursery and early vineyards. As settlement spread market gardens were located in every suburb where the soil was adequate to support them. In the nineteenth century on any afternoon stroll anyone living in any urban area of Sydney, including the city proper, could experience the sight of a market garden.
