= La Perouse, New South Wales =

Suburb in Sydney, Australia

La Perouse
- Suburb
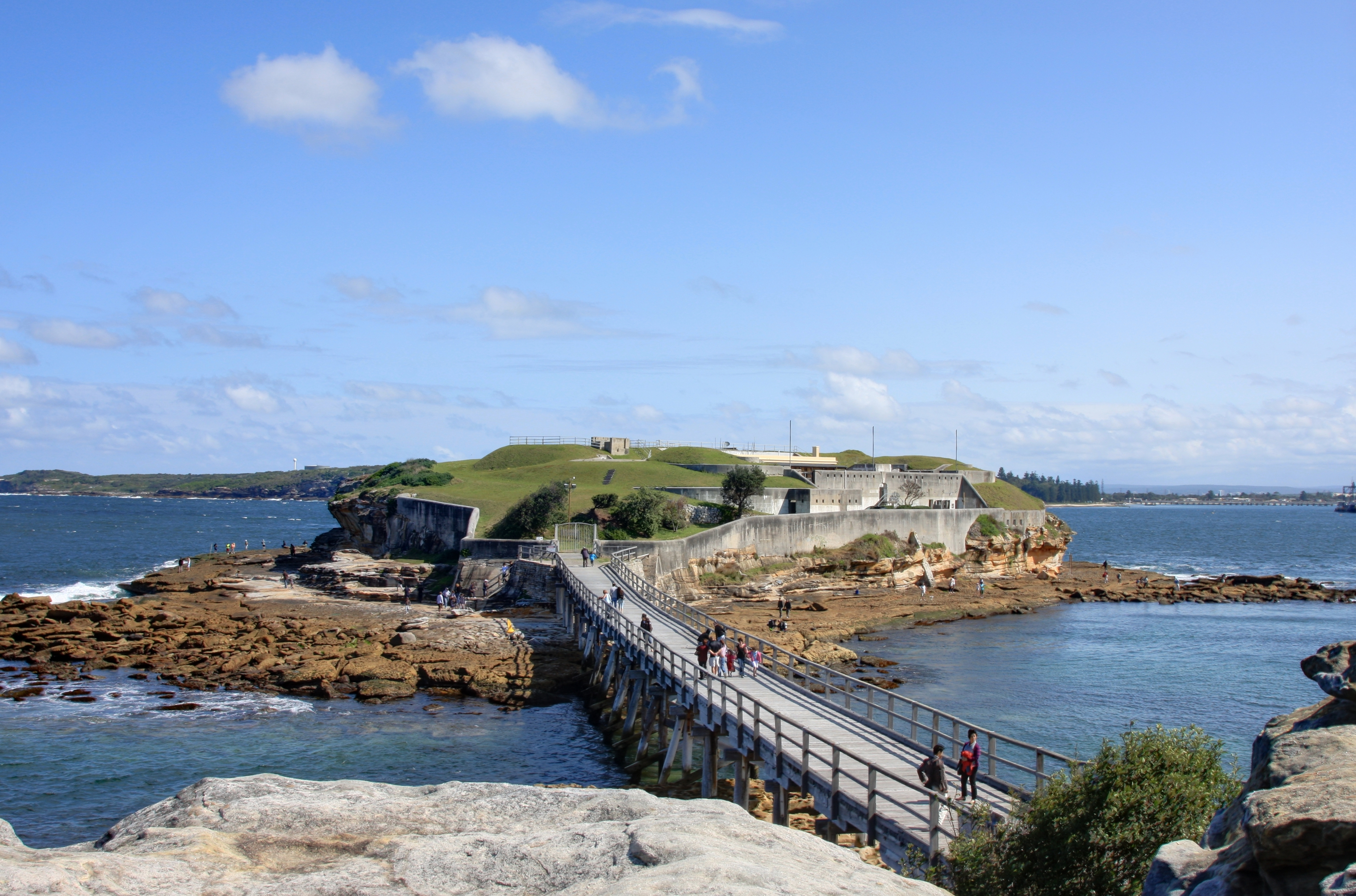
- Bare Island Fort, Botany Bay

- Interactive map of La Perouse
- Country: Australia
- State: New South Wales
- City: Sydney
- LGA: City of Randwick
- Location: 14 km (8.7 mi) south-east of Sydney CBD

Government
  - State electorate: Maroubra
  - Federal division: Kingsford Smith
- Elevation: 12 m (39 ft)

Population
  - Total: 366 (2021 census)
- Postcode: 2036
Suburbs around La Perouse
Phillip Bay	Chifley	Little Bay
	La Perouse
Botany Bay	Kurnell	Tasman Sea

La Perouse is a suburb in the Eastern Suburbs of Sydney, in the state of New South Wales, Australia. The suburb of La Perouse is located about 14 kilometres (8.7 mi) southeast of the Sydney central business district, in the City of Randwick.

The La Perouse peninsula is the northern headland of Botany Bay. It is notable for its old military outpost at Bare Island and the Kamay Botany Bay National Park. Congwong Bay Beach, Little Congwong Beach, and the beach at Frenchmans Bay provide protected swimming areas in Botany Bay. La Perouse is one of few Sydney suburbs with a French name, others being Sans Souci and Vaucluse. Kurnell is located opposite, on the southern headland of Botany Bay.

== History ==
La Perouse was known as "Gooriwal" to the Muruora-dial people of the area. The Gameygal or Kameygal clan of the Dharug people probably lived between the mouth of the Cooks River and present-day La Perouse, including the La Perouse area.

La Perouse was named after the French navigator Jean-François de Galaup, comte de Lapérouse (1741–88), who landed on the northern shore of Botany Bay west of Bare Island on 26 January 1788. Captain Arthur Phillip and the first fleet of convicts had arrived in Botany Bay a few days earlier. King Louis XVI had commissioned Lapérouse to explore the Pacific. In April 1770 James Cook's expedition had sailed onto the east coast of Australia whilst exploring the south Pacific searching for Terra Australis or ‘Land of the South’. Upon King Louis XVI's orders, Lapérouse departed Brest, France, in command of the Astrolabe and Boussole on 1 August 1785 on a scientific voyage of the Pacific inspired by the voyages of Cook. La Perouse in Sydney's south is named after the leader of this French expedition.

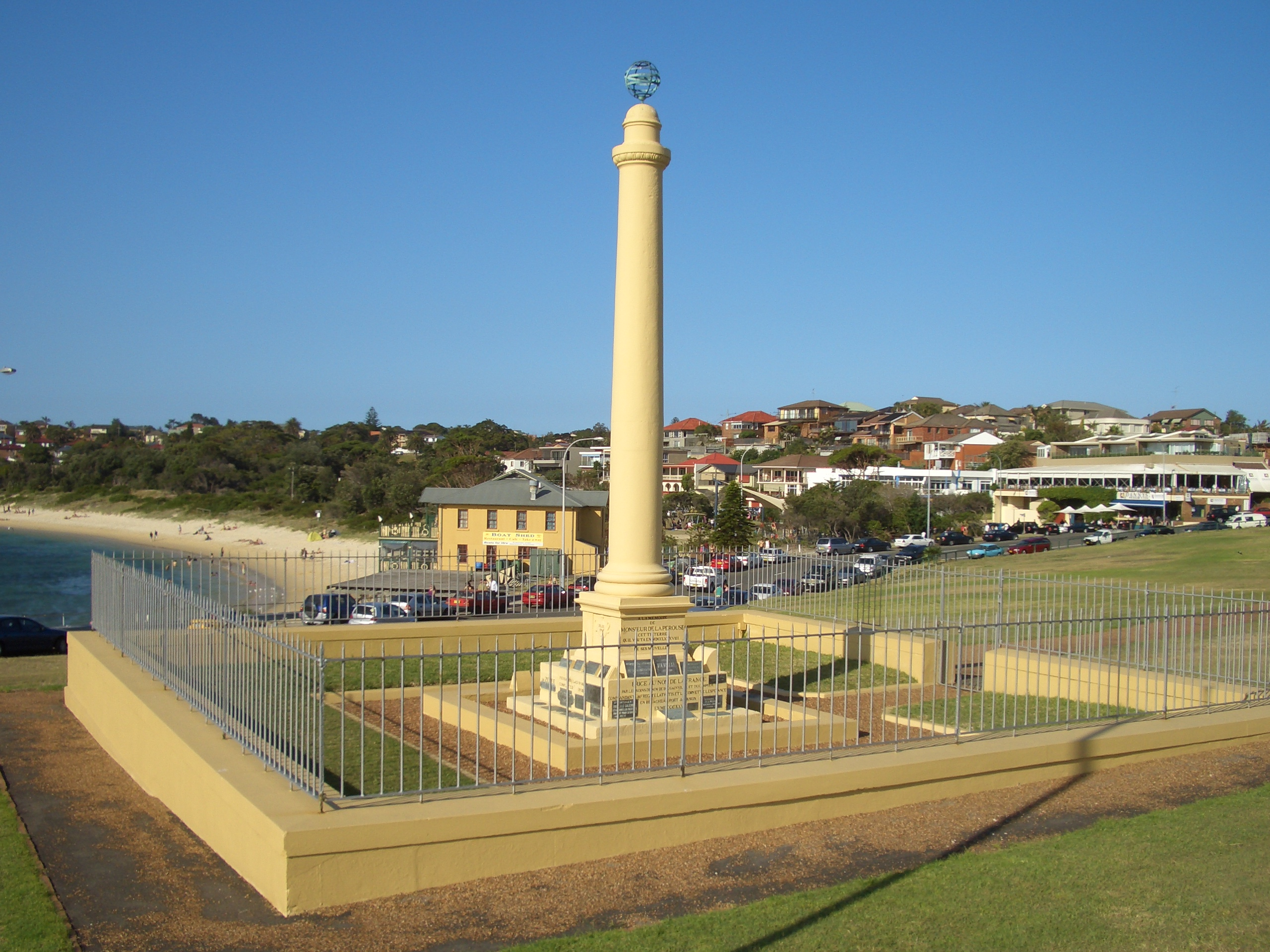
La Perouse Monument, view to Frenchmans Bay

Lapérouse's two ships sailed to New South Wales after 12 of his men had been attacked and killed in the Navigator Islands (Samoa). Astrolabe and Boussole arrived off Botany Bay on 24 January just six days after Captain Arthur Phillip (1738–1814) had anchored just west of Bare Island, in HMS Supply. On 26 January 1788, as Captain John Hunter was moving the First Fleet around to Port Jackson after finding Botany Bay unsuitable for a Settlement, Lapérouse was sailing into Botany Bay, anchoring there just eight days after the British had.

The British received Lapérouse courteously and offered him any assistance he might need. The French were far better provisioned than the British were, and extended the same courtesy but neither offer was accepted. The commander of the Fleet, Captain Phillip, ordered that two British naval vessels, HMS Sirius and Supply, meet the French. Contrary to popular belief, the French did not have orders to claim Terra Australis for France and the arrival of the French ships Astrolabe and Boussole and their meeting with the ships of the British expedition was cordial and followed normal protocols. Lapérouse subsequently sent his journals and letters to Europe with the British ship, the Sirius.

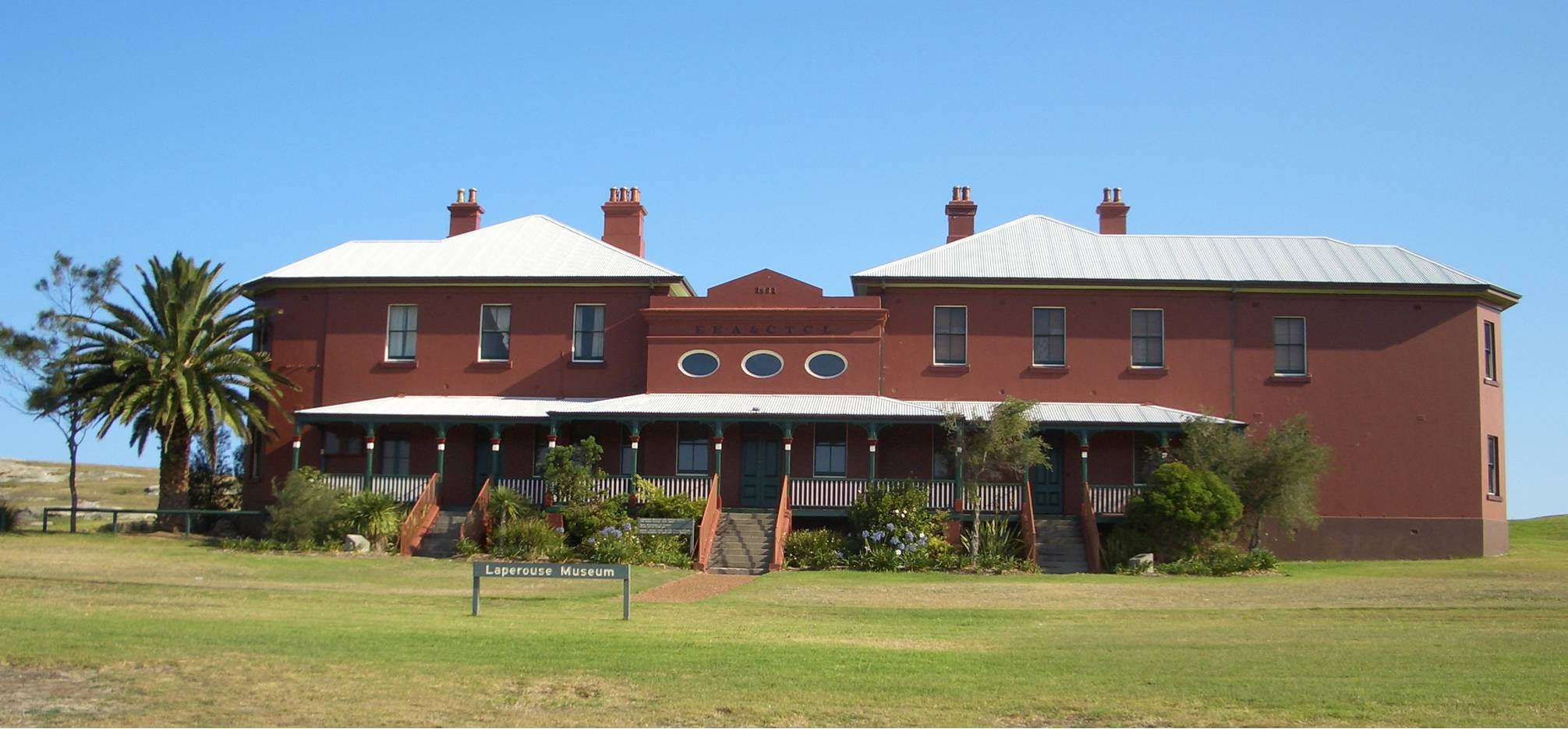
Lapérouse Museum

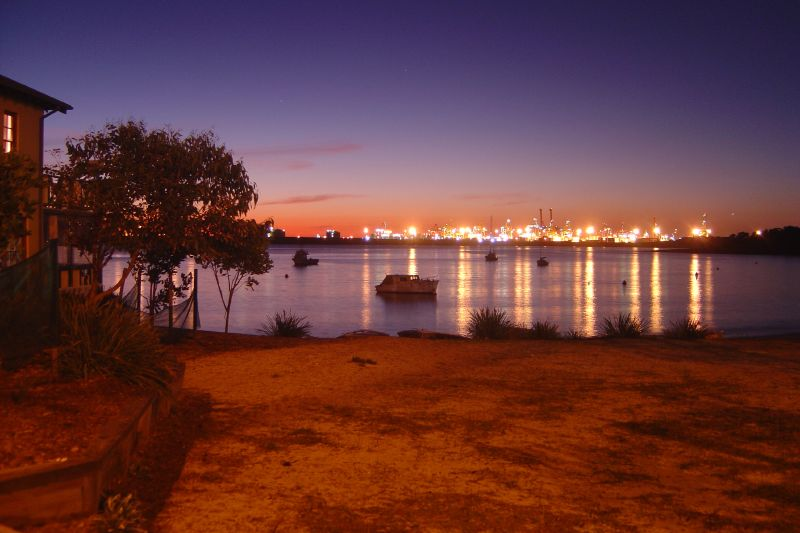
View to Port Botany at dusk

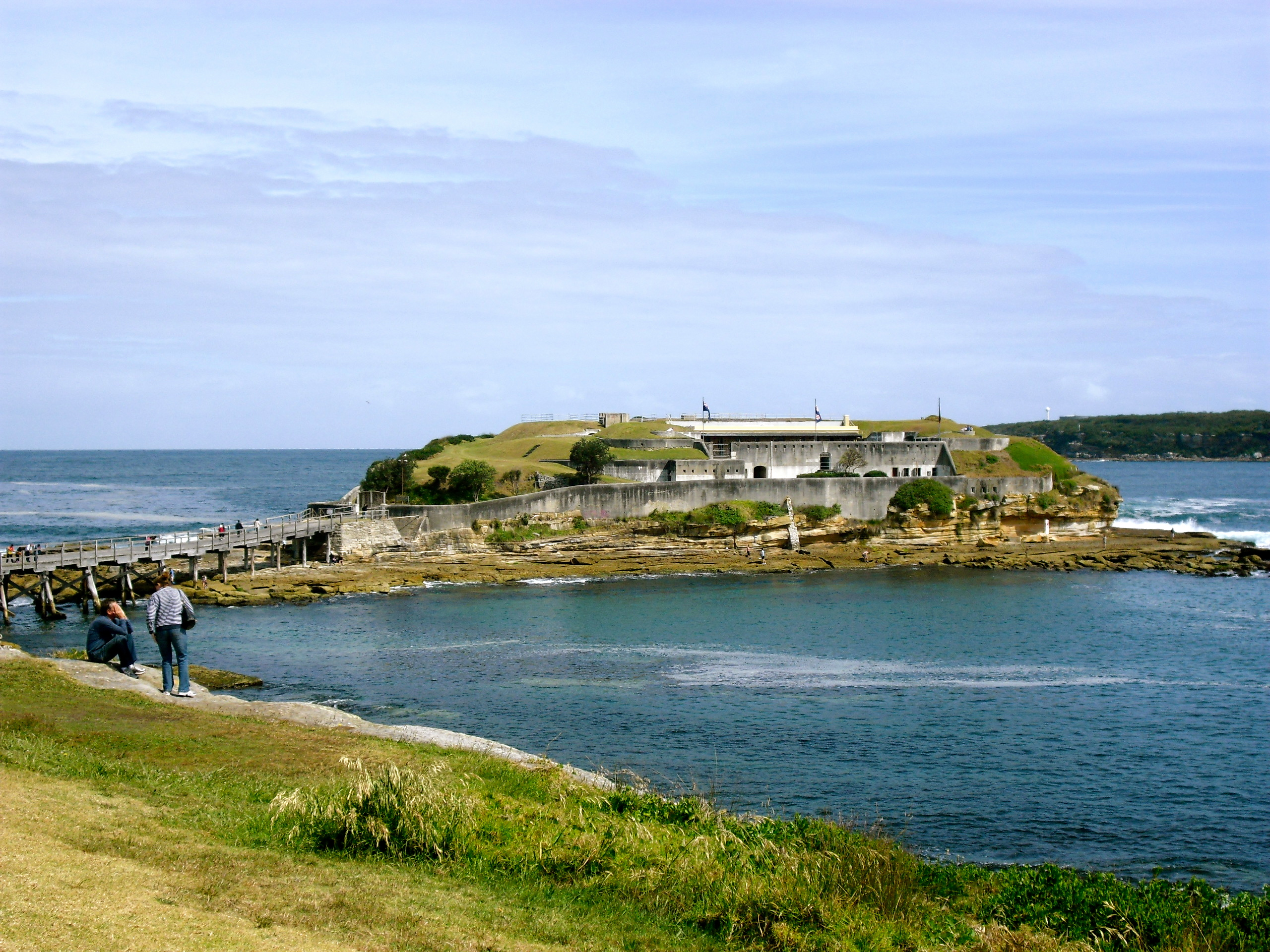
Another perspective of Bare Island Fort.

The expedition's naturalist and chaplain, Father Louis Receveur, died in February after a skirmish the previous December in Samoa with the inhabitants, in which Paul Antoine Fleuriot de Langle, commander of Astrolabe and 12 other members of the French expedition were killed. Receveur, injured in that skirmish, died at Botany Bay and was buried at Frenchmans Cove below the headland that is now called La Perouse, not far from the Lapérouse Museum. The place was marked by a tin plate but the local Aboriginal people quickly removed it. The British replaced it with another and tended the site. In 1824, the tree was inscribed by Victor-Charles Lottin (1781–1846), an ensign visiting with Louis Isidore Duperrey. The following year, Hyacinthe de Bougainville paid for the tombstone that is on the site today. It was designed by Government Architect George Cookney (1799–1876). Receveur was the second European to be buried on the East Coast of Australia, the first being Forby Sutherland from Cook's 1770 expedition who is buried at nearby Kurnell on the other side of the Botany Bay headlands.

The French stayed at Botany Bay for six weeks and built a stockade, observatory and garden for fresh produce on what is now known as the La Perouse peninsula. After completing the building of a longboat (to replace one lost in the attack in the Navigator Islands) and obtaining wood and water, the French departed for New Caledonia, Santa Cruz, the Solomons, and the Louisiades. Lapérouse wrote in his journals that he expected to be back in France by December 1788, but the two ships vanished. The last official sighting of the French expedition was in March 1788 when British lookouts stationed at the South Head of Port Jackson saw the expedition sail from Botany Bay. The French expedition was wrecked a short time later on the reefs of Vanikoro in the Solomon Islands during a cyclone sometime during April or May 1788, the circumstances remained a mystery for 40 years. Some of the mystery was solved in 1826 when items associated with the French ships were found on an island in the Santa Cruz group, with wreckage of the ships themselves discovered in 1964.

More recently two major expeditions have been mounted to explore the sites in Vanikoro. In May 2005, the wreck was formally identified as that of the Boussole. The 2005 expedition was embarked aboard Jacques Cartier, a French naval vessel. The ship supported a multi-discipline scientific team to investigate the "Mystery of Lapérouse". The mission was called "Opération Vanikoro-Sur les traces des épaves de Lapérouse 2005". A further similar mission was mounted in 2008. Between 16 September and 15 October 2008 two French Navy boats set out from Nouméa (New Caledonia) for a voyage to Vanikoro, recreating that section of the final journey of discovery made by Lapérouse.

=== Early subdivision plans ===
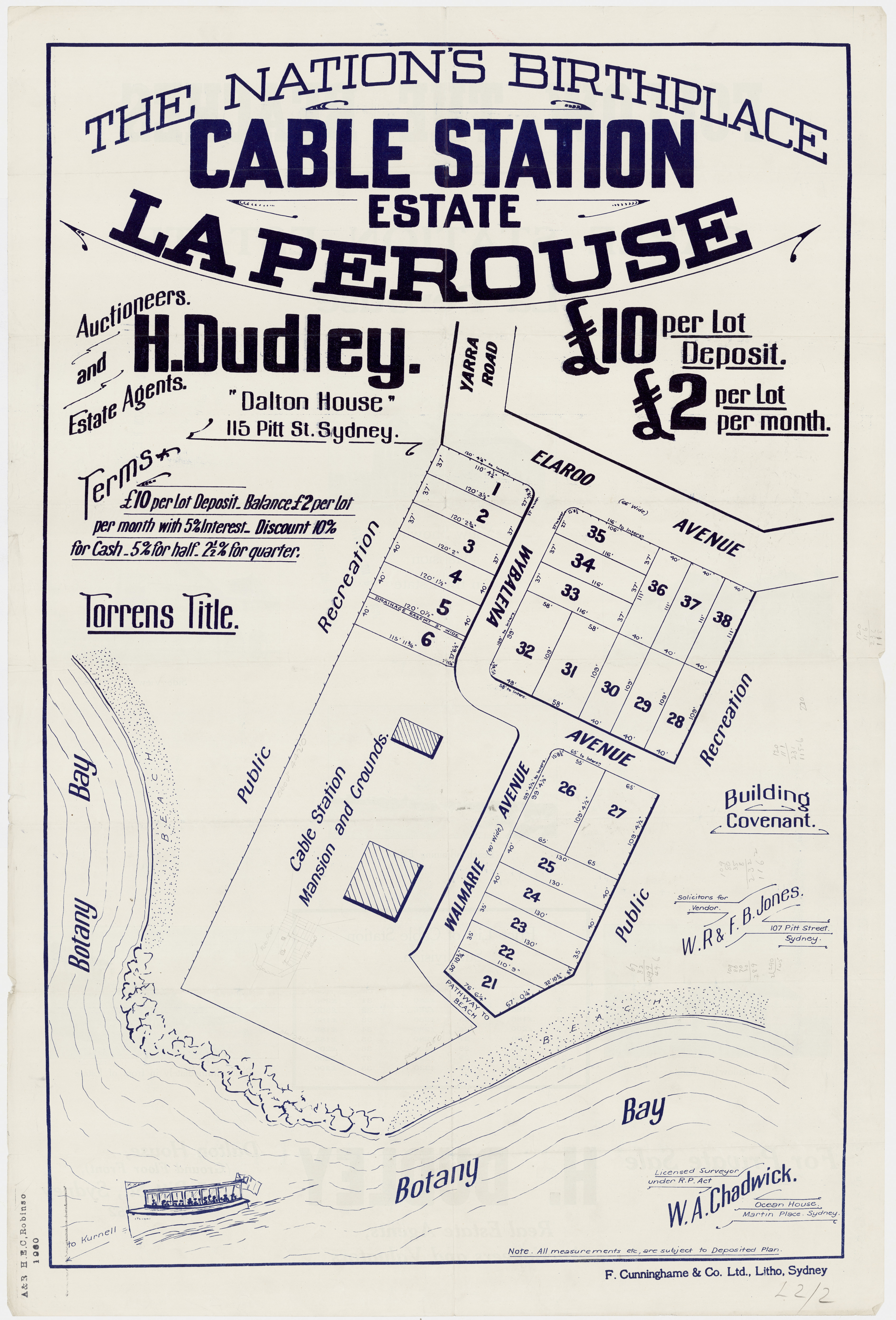
Cable Station Estate, La Perouse – Yarra Rd, Elaroo Ave, Wybalena Ave, Walmarie Ave, 1915–1918

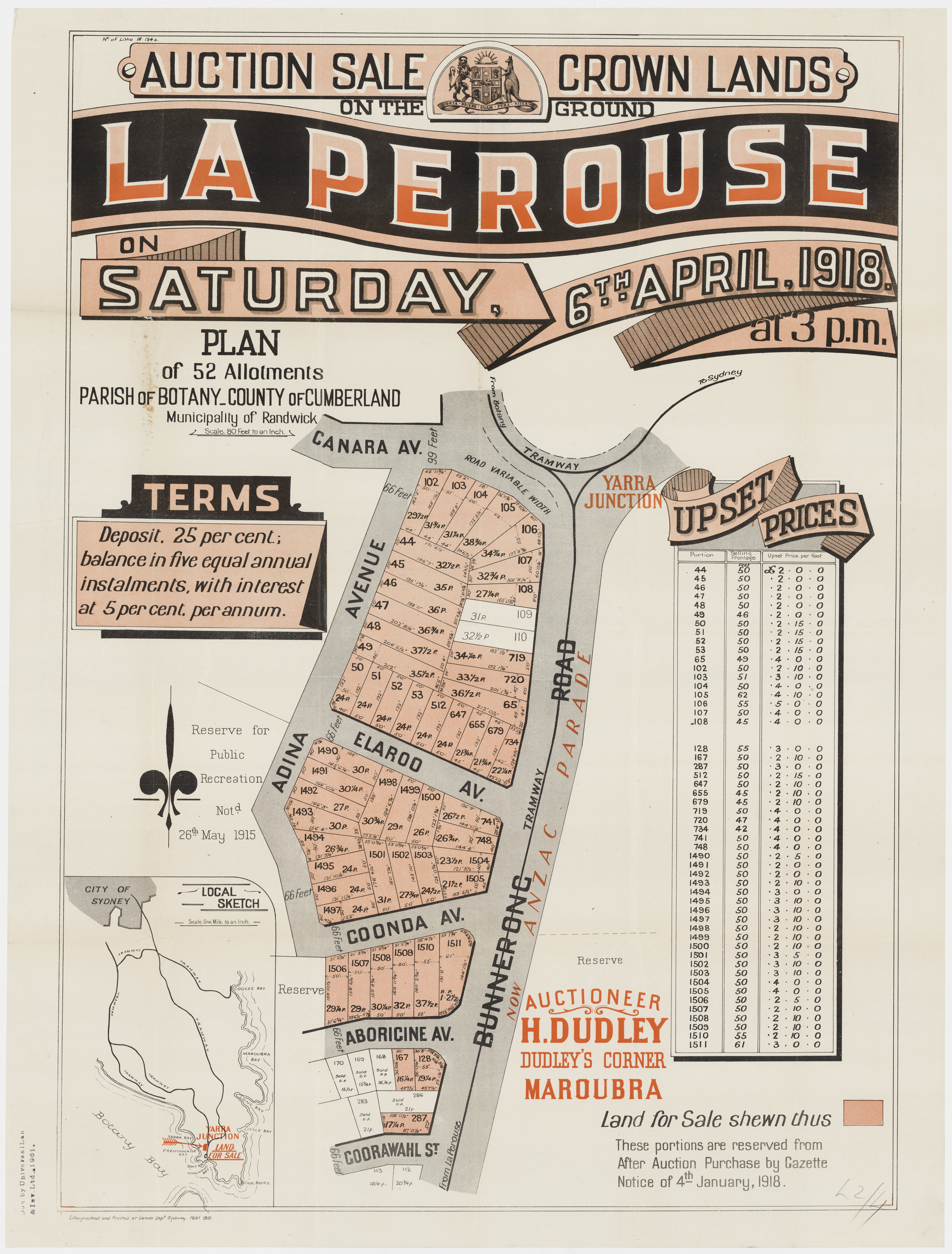
La Perouse – Crown Lands and Upset Prices – Canara Ave, Adina Ave, Elaroo Ave, Coonda Ave, Aboricine Ave, Coorawahl St, Bunnerong Rd, Yarra Junction, 1918

== Historic structures ==
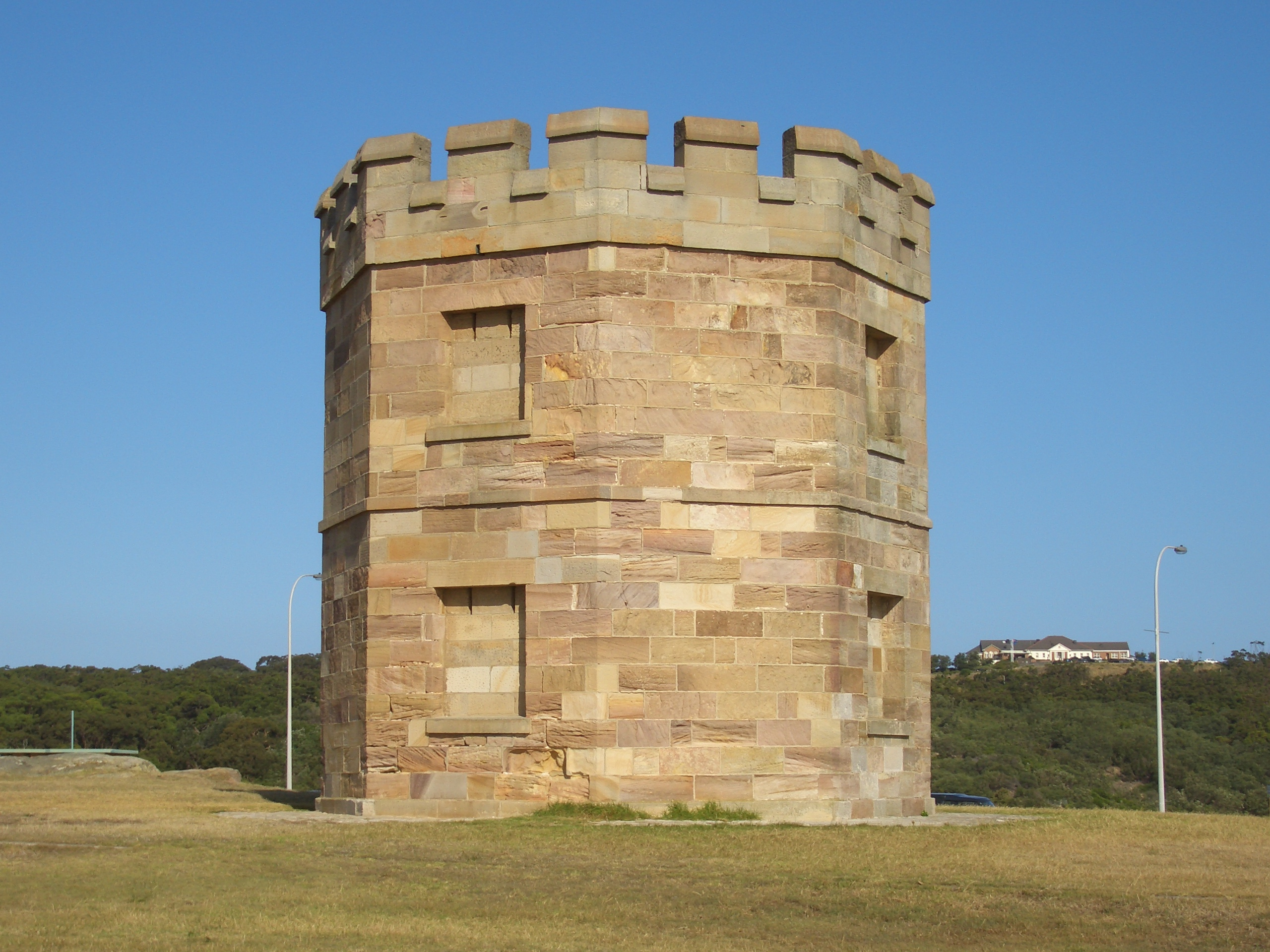
La Perouse's 19th century Customs tower, used to combat smugglers

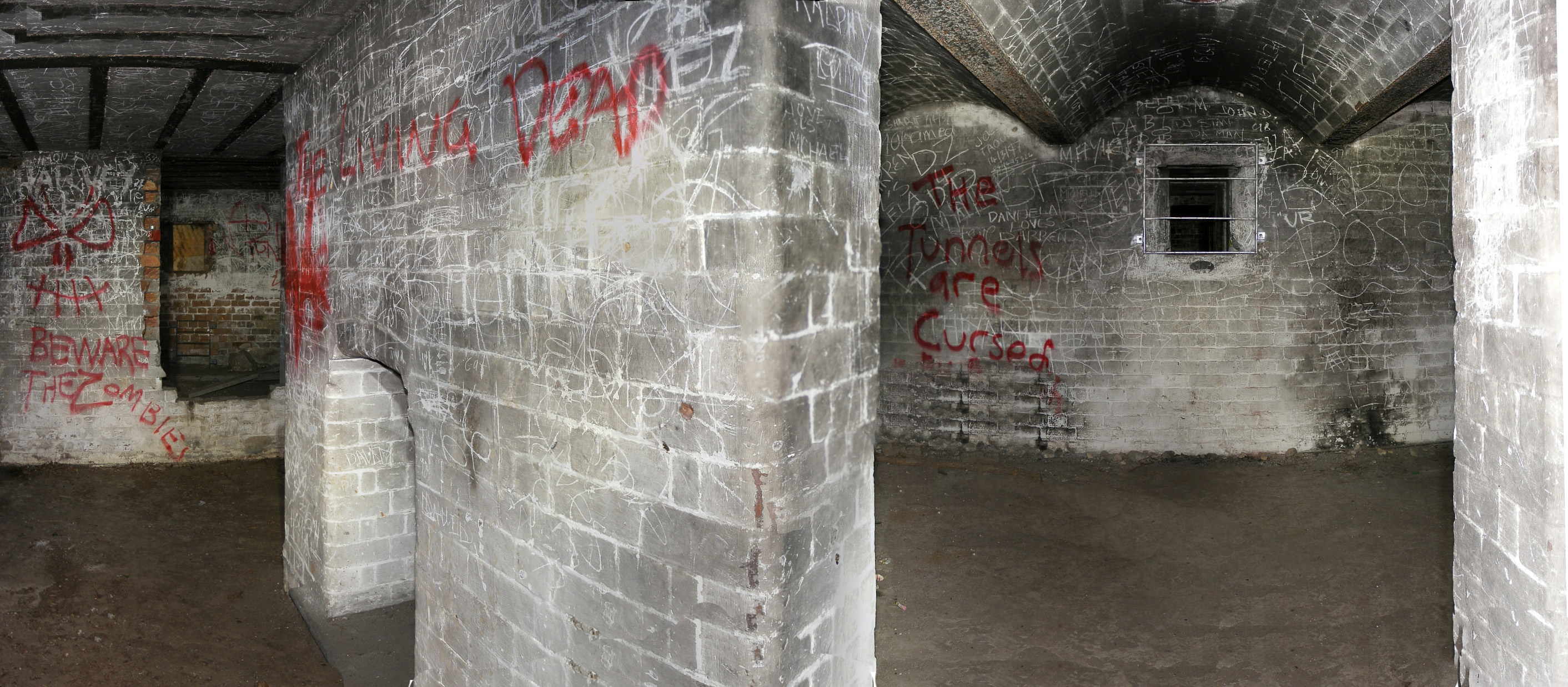
Vaulted ammunition storage rooms and gunpowder magazines of the Henry Head Battery, La Perouse

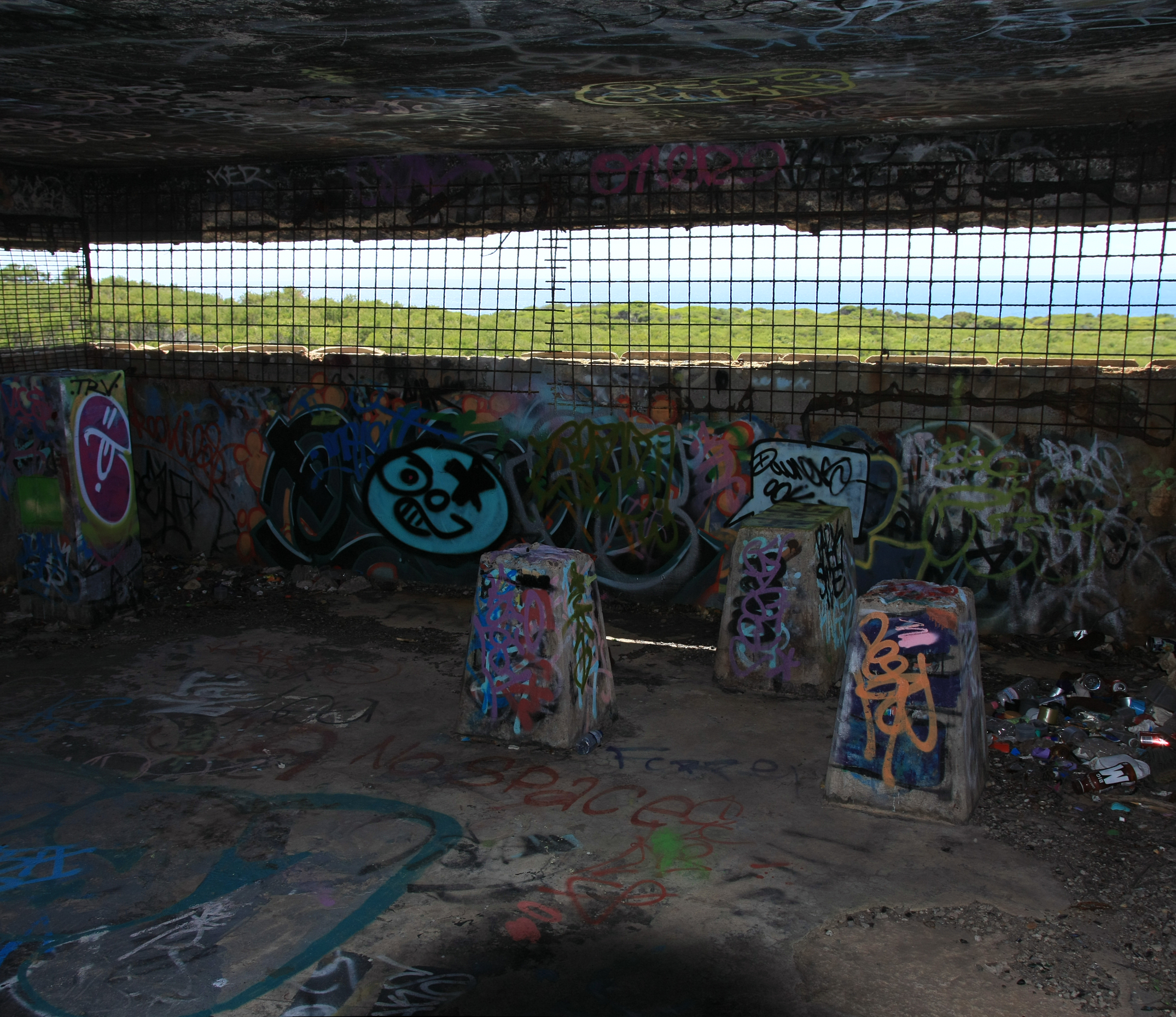
Vandalized World War II bunker (Inside the observation post)

The first building in the area was the octagonal stone tower constructed in 1820–22 as accommodation for a small guard of soldiers stationed there to prevent smuggling, and the tower still stands today. By 1885, an Aboriginal reserve had been established in the suburb and a number of missions were operated in the area. In 1984, following the passage of the Aboriginal Land Rights Act 1983 (NSW) the La Perouse Local Aboriginal Land Council was given title to the reserve and adjacent land. The original church was dismantled and moved to the corner of Elaroo and Adina Avenues, where it still stands. It is known as the La Perouse Mission Church.

A kiosk was built in 1896 to cater for tourists who came to see the attractions, including snake-handling shows. During the Great Depression, from the late 1920s, many severely affected low-income families took up residence here in settlements beside the Aboriginal reserve.

The small island just inside the heads was described by Captain James Cook as "a small bare island". Bare Island was fortified in 1885, according to a design by colonial architect, James Barnet (1827–1904), and fitted with heavy guns. In 1912 Bare Island became a retirement home for war veterans, which continued to operate until 1963, when it was handed over to the New South Wales Parks and Wildlife Service for use as a museum and tourist attraction.

Apart from the fortification on Bare Island two other fortifications are located within La Perouse, one of them, Fort Banks is located on Cape Banks. This facility was part of the Eastern Command Fixed Defences unit, it was designed and positioned in a way that would allow it to protect the approaches to Botany Bay in the event of a sea born attack during the World War II period. Henry Head Battery, constructed 1892–1895, operated until 1910, when the fort became obsolete. The battery along with two gun-emplacements and observation posts was recommissioned for use during the second World War.

== Heritage listings ==
La Perouse has a number of heritage-listed sites, including:

- Bare Island Fort
- 46 Adina Avenue: La Perouse Mission Church
- 1–39 Bunnerong Road: Chinese Market Gardens (La Perouse)

=== Trams ===
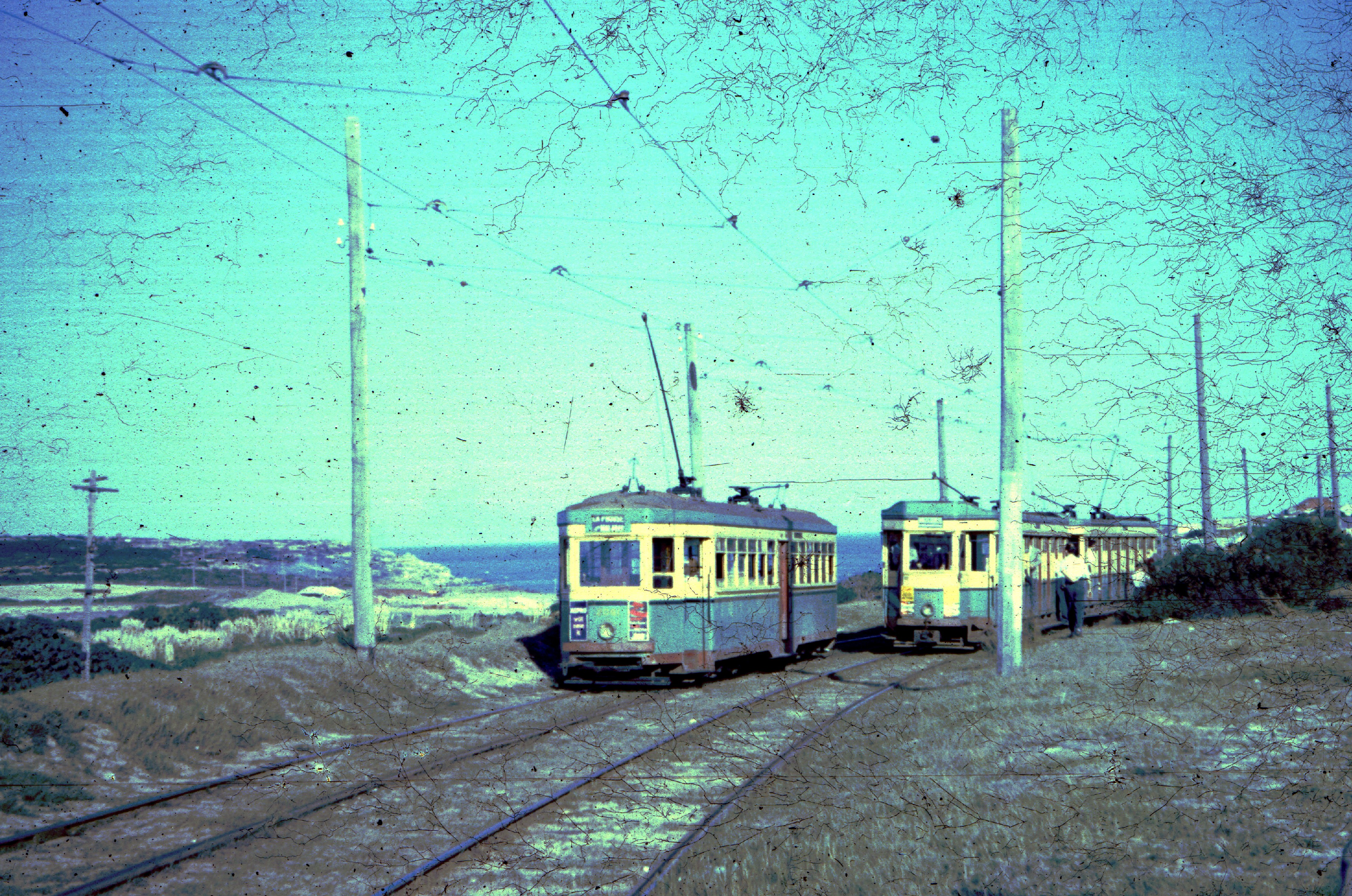
Trams on Anzac Parade, La Peruse, 1960

The former La Perouse tram line branched from Oxford Street at Taylor Square in Darlinghurst to run south along Flinders Street, then into its own tram reservation along the eastern side of Anzac Parade beside Moore Park. It then proceeded down the centre of Anzac Parade through Maroubra Junction, and Malabar to its balloon loop terminus at La Perouse. At Malabar, a single line branched off to serve Long Bay Gaol. The line was double track throughout. The line reached La Perouse in stages from 1900 to 1902. The Loop is the circular track that was built as part of the Sydney tram terminus at La Perouse. Closure was supported by the NRMA, but generally went against public opinion. Nevertheless, closure became Labor government policy and the system was wound down in stages, with withdrawal of the last service, to La Perouse in 1961. The line followed the current route of Transdev John Holland bus route 394X.

== Transport ==
La Perouse is served by Transdev John Holland bus routes 390X to Bondi Junction and 394X to Museum railway station.

In the 1890s a ferry service began operating between La Perouse and Kurnell. It ceased in 1974 after storms damaged the wharves.

In February 2025 a new La Perouse ferry wharf opened. Two attempts to entice a private ferry operator to operate between La Perouse and Kurnell have not been successful.

== Demographics ==
According to the 2021 census of Population, there were 366 people in La Perouse.

- Aboriginal and Torres Strait Islander people made up 32.2% of the population.
- 69.1% of people were born in Australia and 77.9% of people spoke only English at home.
- The most common response for religion was No Religion (30.9% of the population).

== Attractions ==
The La Perouse Museum contains maps, scientific instruments and relics recovered from French explorers. A walking trail from the museum to the Endeavour Lighthouse has views across the bay to the site of Captain Cook's Landing Place. The large Lapérouse Monument is an obelisk erected in 1825 by the French, located close to the museum. Another memorial marks the grave of Father Receveur. The fortified Bare Island is linked by a footbridge. The museum building was designed by colonial architect James Barnet & built 1880-1881 as a cable station to house the operation of the first submarine telegraph communications cable laid between Australia and Nelson in New Zealand. This cable also served as the first link in telegraph communications between New Zealand and the rest of the world. After the cessation of telegraph communications, the building served as a home for orphans run by the Salvation Army, with the children attending La Perouse Public School when this first opened in the early 1950s.

Visitors can learn about the Indigenous significance of the area from the Aboriginal people of the area, with boomerang-throwing demonstrations often held on weekends and Aboriginal guided tours operating from Yarra Bay House during the week. Aboriginal artefacts are produced and sold by locals. The Snake Man of La Perouse has an outdoor reptile show is also a tourist attraction in the pit, at The Loop, on Sunday afternoons. The reptile shows were begun by the legendary Professor Fox in the late 19th century and resumed by George Cann just after the Great War in 1918. The tradition was continued by members of the Cann family, until recently, and other snake handlers since. John Cann gave his last show at the Loop on Sunday 18 April 2010.

John Cann showing red-bellied blacks - his favourites - at La Pa Loop. 8 January 2006

La Perouse has a few cafés and restaurants around the historic precinct, close to Frenchmans Bay.

The New South Wales Golf Club, a links–style golf course, is at La Perouse, facing both Botany Bay and the Tasman Sea.

== Scuba diving ==
The area around the La Perouse peninsula is considered to be one of the best scuba diving sites in NSW. Bare Island has a number of dive sites, some of which extend to over 19 metres in depth. The reef around the area is extensive. There are also a number of dives around the mainland at La Perouse. Scuba divers here can see the common (weedy) sea dragon, pygmy pipefish, big-belly seahorses and other fish common in the Sydney area.

Little Congwong Beach is popular for snorkeling, and it has also been used for decades as an unofficial nude beach.

== In popular culture ==
- Several scenes from Mission: Impossible 2 (2000) were filmed in La Perouse, including Bare Island.

== Notable residents ==
- Kevin Longbottom, (1940−1986), rugby league player
- Lola Ryan (1925−2003), shellworker
- Emma Timbery (c. 1842−1916), Aboriginal shellworker and matriarch
- Esme Timbery (1931–2023), shellworker
- The Cann family, who showed reptiles at La Perouse for 90 years.

== Gallery ==
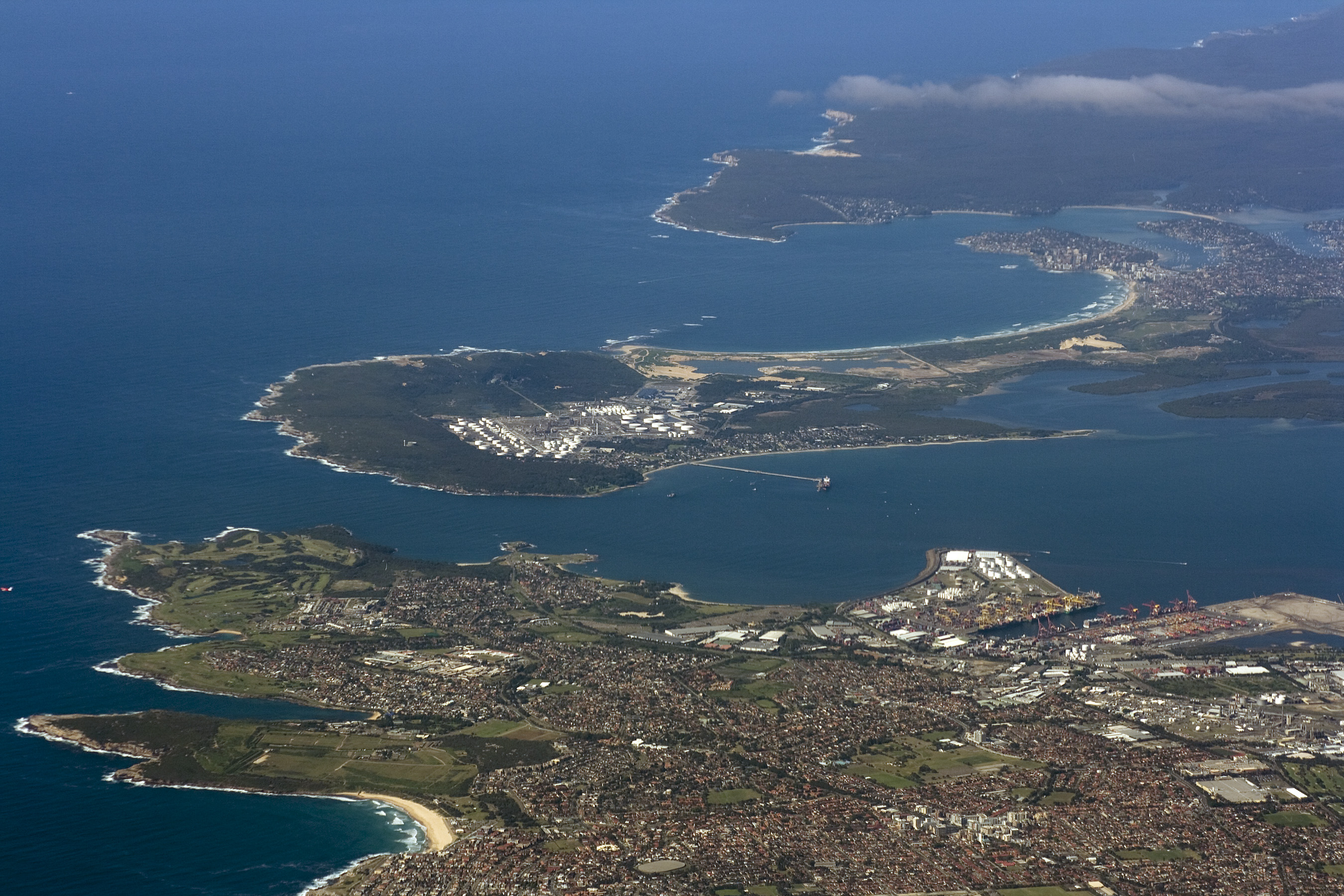
Aerial view of Kurnell, La Perouse, Cronulla and Botany Bay
