= Doryichthys heterosoma =

Conservation status
- Data Deficient (IUCN 3.1)

Scientific classification
- Kingdom: Animalia
- Phylum: Chordata
- Class: Actinopterygii
- Order: Syngnathiformes
- Family: Syngnathidae
- Genus: Doryichthys
- Species: D. heterosoma

Binomial name
- Doryichthys heterosoma Bleeker, 1851

Synonyms
- Microphis heterosoma Bleeker, 1851; Syngnathus heterosoma Bleeker, 1851

Species of fish

Doryichthys heterosoma is a species of freshwater fish of the family Syngnathidae. It is only known from four specimens, which were collected from the Sambas River in West Kalimantan and the Natuna Islands in 1851. It is thought to be endemic to these locations, feeding on small crustaceans and insect larvae, where it can attain a maximum length of at least 35 centimetres (14 in). This species is ovoviviparous, with males carrying eggs and giving birth to live young.
