= Lola Ryan =

Australian artist (1925–2003)

- Born: 1925
- Died: 2003 (aged 77–78)
- Known for: Shell art

Lola Ryan (1925–2003) was an Australian shellworker of Tharawal/Eora descent who lived in La Perouse. Her work is in the permanent collections of several Australian museums.

== Biography ==
Ryan, who was of Tharawal/Eora descent, lived in La Perouse and learned shellworking from her family. Ryan often worked with her sister, Mavis Longbottom. Ryan and her sister, Longbottom, started selling their work as children. The sisters would collect shells from Yarra Beach and other areas along the coast of New South Wales.

== Work ==
Ryan's work is often brightly coloured, "encrusted" and scaled for use as art in the home. She began to work with art collector, Peter Fay, in the late 1990s. She started showing her work in galleries around the same time and in 2001, she showed her work at Gitte Weise's Gallery.

Ryan's work is in the collections of the National Gallery of Australia, the Art Gallery of New South Wales, the Lawrence Wilson Art Gallery, the Australian National Maritime Museum, the Museum of Contemporary Art, and the Museum of Applied Arts & Sciences.
