= La Perouse ferry wharf =

La Perouse

General information
- Location: La Perouse, New South Wales; Australia
- Coordinates: 33.9871°S 151.2296°E
- Owner: Transport for NSW
- Platforms: 1

Construction
- Accessible: Yes

Other information
- Status: Open

History
- Opened: February 2025
Location

La Perouse ferry wharf is located on the southern side of Botany Bay in the Sydney suburb of La Perouse. As at September 2026, it has no regular services.

== History ==
In the 1890s a ferry service began operating between La Perouse and Kurnell. It ceased in 1974 after storms damaged the wharves.

In June 2020, the Berejiklin Government announced its intentiion to reinstate ferry services on Botany Bay and rebuild La Perouse wharf. Built by McConnell Dowell, it was completed in February 2025.

Two attempts to entice a private ferry operator have not been successful, with the project having been labelled a white elephant.
