= Doryichthys deokhatoides =

Conservation status
- Data Deficient (IUCN 3.1)

Scientific classification
- Kingdom: Animalia
- Phylum: Chordata
- Class: Actinopterygii
- Order: Syngnathiformes
- Family: Syngnathidae
- Genus: Doryichthys
- Species: D. deokhatoides

Binomial name
- Doryichthys deokhatoides Bleeker, 1856

Synonyms
- Doryichthys bilineatus Kaup (ex Heckel), 1856; Doryichthys fluviatilis Duncker, 1904; Microphis annandalei Hora, 1924; Microphis annandalei Hora, 1924; Syngnathus deokhatoides Bleeker, 1854

Species of fish

Doryichthys deokhatoides is a species of freshwater fish of the family Syngnathidae. It is found in the Mekong basin, Chao Phraya basin, Malay Peninsula, Sumatra and Borneo. It lives among grasses, roots or shore vegetation in slow moving river stretches, where it can grow to lengths of 18.5 centimetres (7.3 in). It is benthopelagic. This species is ovoviviparous, with males carrying eggs in a brood pouch before giving birth to live young. This species is normally found along river stretches with a slow current, amongst grasses, roots or marginal vegetation.
