= Esme Timbery =

Australian Bidjigal artist and shellworker (1931–2023)

Esme Russell
- Born: February 14, 1931; Port Kembla, New South Wales
- Died: October 6, 2023 (aged 92); New South Wales South Coast
- Style: Shellcraft
- Relatives: Emma Timbery (great-grandmother)

Esme Russell (née Timbery; 14 February 1931 – 6 October 2023) was an Australian Bidjigal artist and shellworker. Timbery's shellwork had contemporary elements blended with the traditional medium. Her work is in the collections of several art museums throughout Australia.

== Biography ==
Timbery was born on 14 February 1931 in the New South Wales town of Port Kembla (now a suburb of Wollongong) and was of Bidjigal Aboriginal heritage. Timbery began to create shellwork at a young age. She came from a long line of shellworkers including her great-grandmother, Emma Timbery. Timbery and her sister, Rose, began to sell their shellwork in the 1940s.

Timbery worked in La Perouse. ABC produced a documentary about her in 2007, titled She Sells Sea Shells.

Esme Timbery died in a nursing home on the New South Wales South Coast, on 6 October 2023, aged 92. She had eight children.

== Work ==
Timbery's work was exhibited at the 1988 opening of the Powerhouse Museum. In 1997, her work was exhibited at the Manly Regional Museum and Gallery in the show, "Djalarinji – Something that Belongs to Us." Her work was included in the 2004 show, "Terra Alterisu: Land of Another" held at the College of Fine Arts in Paddington. She also exhibited in the 2008 Campbelltown Arts Centre show "Ngadhu Ngulili, Ngeaninyagu – A Personal History of Aboriginal Art in the Premier State." For the Message Sticks Festival in 2001, Timbery was asked to create shellworked versions of the Sydney Opera House. The Opera House pieces reflected a more contemporary use of shellworking. In 2005, she earned the NSW Indigenous Art Prize for her work. She also decorated shoes for the design label, Romance Was Born for their Spring/Summer 2009/2010 collection.

Timbery's piece Shellworked Slippers (2008) was made up of 200 scuffs embellished with shellwork. The piece was also a memorial to the Stolen Generations. The piece was exhibited at the Sydney Biennale and is in the collection of the Museum of Contemporary Art Australia. Shellworked Slippers also represented the strength of Aboriginal women. Three of her shellworked Sydney Harbour Bridges are part of the collection of the National Museum of Australia. Timbery also has art at the National Gallery of Australia and the Art Gallery of New South Wales.

== Honours ==
A building at the University of New South Wales was named in honour of Timbery, the Creative Practice Lab (ETCPL). The building is decorated with a mural titled In her hands and it is the first building at the University named after an Aboriginal woman.

In 2020, a river-class ferry on the Sydney Ferries network was named in her honour.
