= Doryichthys contiguus =

Pygmy pipefish

Conservation status
- Data Deficient (IUCN 3.1)

Scientific classification
- Kingdom: Animalia
- Phylum: Chordata
- Class: Actinopterygii
- Order: Syngnathiformes
- Family: Syngnathidae
- Genus: Doryichthys
- Species: D. contiguus

Binomial name
- Doryichthys contiguus Kottelat, 2000

Species of fish

Doryichthys contiguus, the pygmy pipefish, is a species of freshwater fish of the family Syngnathidae. It is found in the lower Mekong basin in Lao PDR, Thailand, and Cambodia. It lives among grasses, roots, or shore vegetation in slow moving river stretches, where it can grow to lengths of 11 centimetres (4.3 in). This species is ovoviviparous, with males carrying eggs before giving birth to live young. Its body is a dark brown.
