= Emma Timbery =

(1842–1916) Aboriginal shellworker

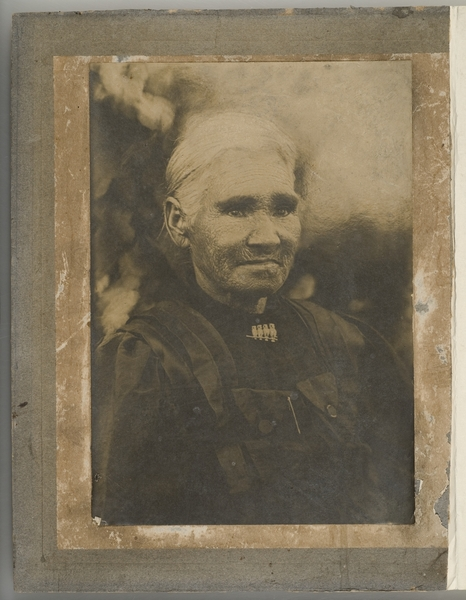
Emma Timbery in 1895.

Emma Timbery (c. 1842 - 26 November 1916) was an Aboriginal Australian shellworker and matriarch. She was also known as the "Queen of the Illawarra", "Queen of La Perouse" or "Granny Timbery." Her shellwork became part of a family tradition that continues to the present day. Timbery was also a Christian convert and active in the Christian Endeavor Society in La Perouse. Timbery also acted as a cultural informant about her language, Dharawal.

== Biography ==
Timbery was born on the Georges River at Liverpool, New South Wales. She spoke Dharawal and was originally known by her stepfather's last name, Lond or Lownds, who was a Dharug man and language informant. At the age of ten, she was taken to live with Mr. and Mrs. Edward Hill in Surry Hills, New South Wales. There, she began attending Sunday School regularly. She married George Timbery, an Aboriginal fisherman, in 1864 in Botany Bay. She and George had 11 children together. The couple had moved to La Perouse by 1882 where Timbery was able to make extra money creating shell baskets. Timbery's shellwork was displayed on a regular basis and sold annually in Sydney at the Royal Easter Show. Timbery's work is part of the "early phase" of La Perouse shellwork. In 1910, her shellwork was displayed in London.

Timbery was revered in the community, known as "Queen of La Perouse" or "Granny Timbery." Timbery was also a skilled fisher, and on at least two occasions, in 1876 and in the early 1900s, a boat was provided for the community to enable them to catch their own fish. The boat provided in 1876 was named the "Queen Emma", in honour of Timbery.

Timbery was also an informant on her own culture, working with the anthropologist R.H. Mathews, who was studying the Dharawal language and culture. Maria Nugent writes that Timbery's "information has been essential for the preservation and revival of the Dharawal language." Timbery, who had become a Christian convert in the early 1890s, was also involved with Christian missionaries at the La Perouse Aboriginal settlement and also with the Christian Endeavor Society. Timbery was elected as vice president of the Christian Endeavor Society branch in La Perouse. Timbery was close to missionary, Retta Dixon and the two women worked together. It was believed by the community that Queen Victoria had left lands to Timbery, but the paperwork had been destroyed in a fire.

Timbery died in La Perouse on 26 November 1916 and was buried in Botany Cemetery. She left behind a long family legacy of arts with her grandson, Joseph Timbery, noted as a boomerang maker and women in her family continuing to do shellwork. Her great-granddaughter, Esme Russell, won awards for her shellwork.

== See also ==
- List of Indigenous Australian historical figures
