= Greenhills Beach =

Beach in New South Wales, Australia

- Beach
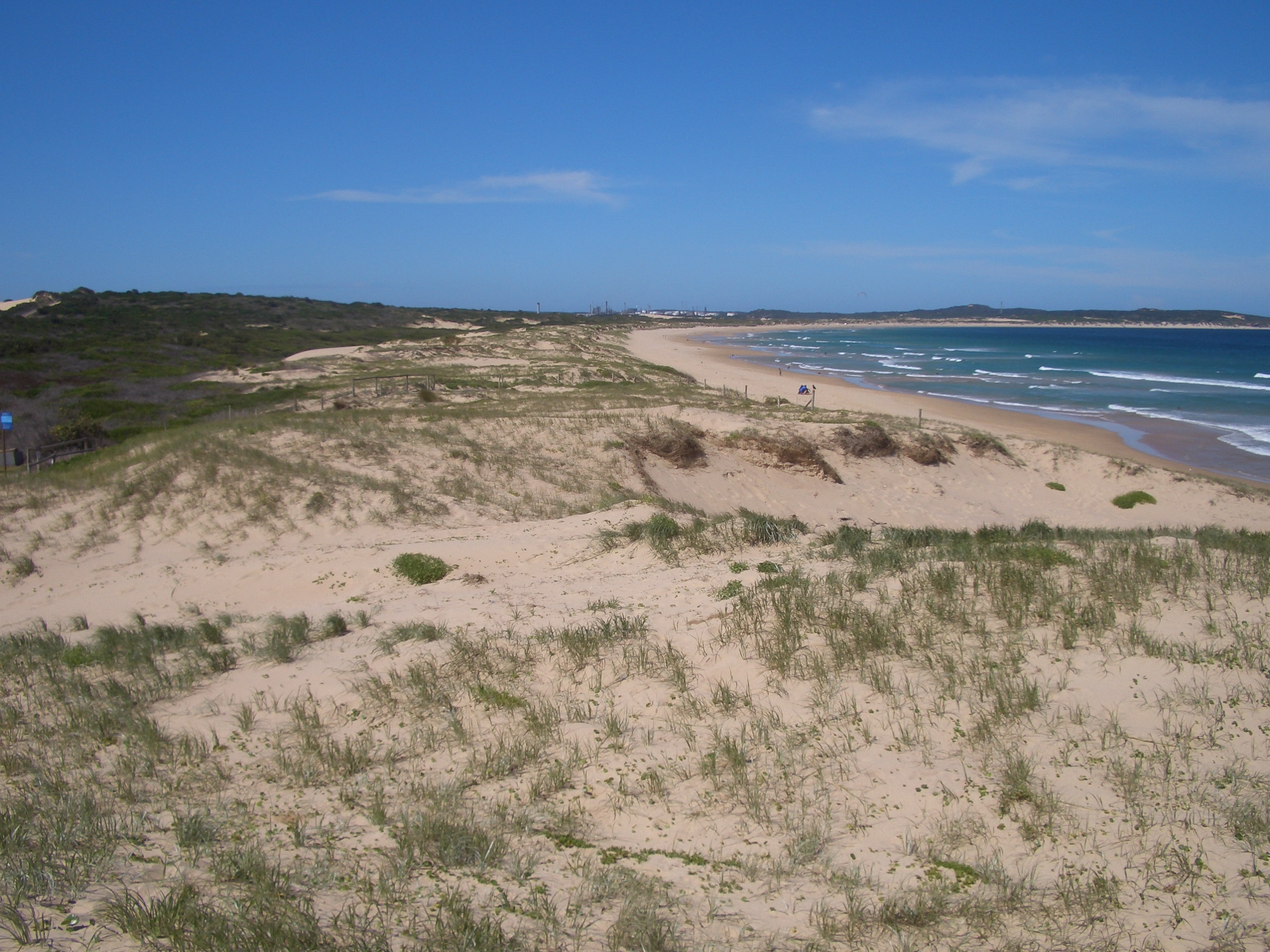
- View across Greenhills Beach facing north
- Interactive map of Greenhills Beach
- Coordinates: 34°02′18″S 151°10′11″E
- Location: Greenhills Beach, Sydney, New South Wales, Australia

Dimensions
  - Length: 3000 m
- Hazard rating: 3/10 (least hazardous)

Greenhills Beach is an unpatrolled beach on Bate Bay, located in Greenhills Beach, Sydney, New South Wales, Australia. The beach is located roughly 18 kilometres from the Sydney central business district, in the local government area of the Sutherland Shire. Recognised as one of Sydney's longest beaches, Greenhills Beach is roughly 3 kilometres in length and forms part of a chain of beaches residing on Bate Bay. It is the northernmost section of the Greenhills-North Cronulla beach complex and is the only section of the beach not to be patrolled by a volunteer Surf Club or by surf lifesavers.

== History ==
The beach's name, 'Greenhills', originates from the Cronulla sand dunes. Prior to European settlement the dunes were abundant with vegetation. However, within a century of European settlement, most of the original vegetation had been cleared, exposing the sand dunes. The sand was subsequently mined in this region by Europeans for years. Many patches of tall grass and shrubs still remain on the dunes, giving a green-colored tint to the hills, thus its naming.

== Overview ==
Greenhills Beach is the northernmost and longest section of a 4-beach complex known as Greenhills-North Cronulla, which also includes Wanda Beach, Elouera Beach and North Cronulla Beach. Greenhills Beach, due to its small notoriety and lack of crowds compared to its southern neighbours, is often cited as a destination for beach-goers in Sydney and for tourists. Greenhills Beach is also one of few beaches in Sydney to allow dogs to roam the beach, with dogs being allowed off-leash between 4pm and 10am. After community lobbying, the Sutherland Shire Council allowed dogs to roam the beach 24 hours a day following a decision in August 2013. Following two serious dog attacks on the beach however, the new regulations were repealed after only three weeks, with the council voting to scrap the 24-hour off-leash dogs idea altogether in November 2013.

== Merries Reef ==
A small reef system known as Merries Reef is located at 34°02′47″S 151°11′34″E, at the northernmost part of Greenhills Beach, off the coastal rocks near Boat Harbour. Since 2001, the reef has been protected by the New South Wales Department of Primary Industries as part of the Boat Harbour Aquatic Reserve, is characterised as a popular spearfishing and marine collection area. The reef is home to various lobsters such as southern rock lobsters and blacklip abalones. Geographically, the reef also serves as a wave break, contributing to the low surf at Greenhills Beach.

== Gallery ==
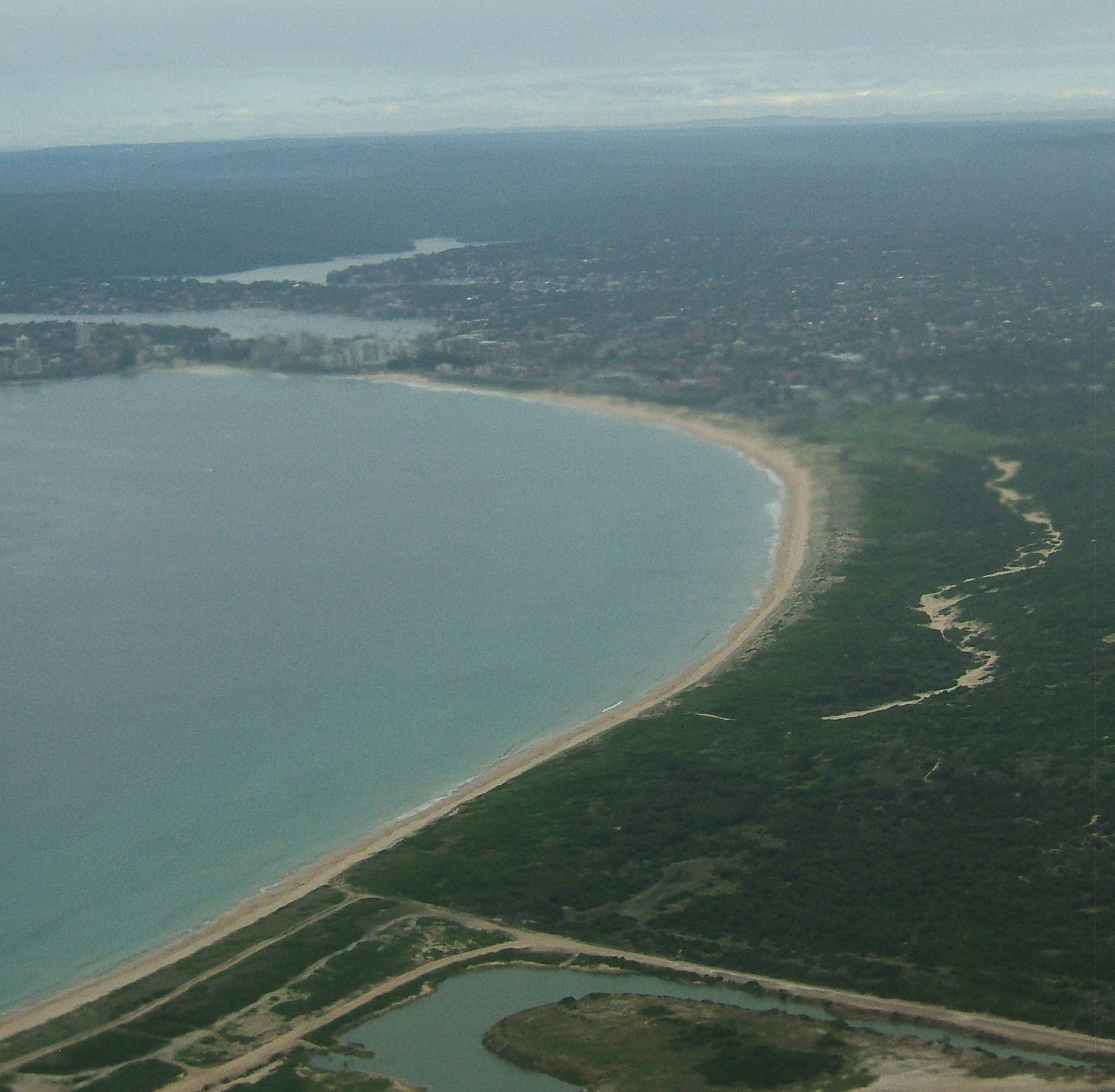
Aerial image, looking west

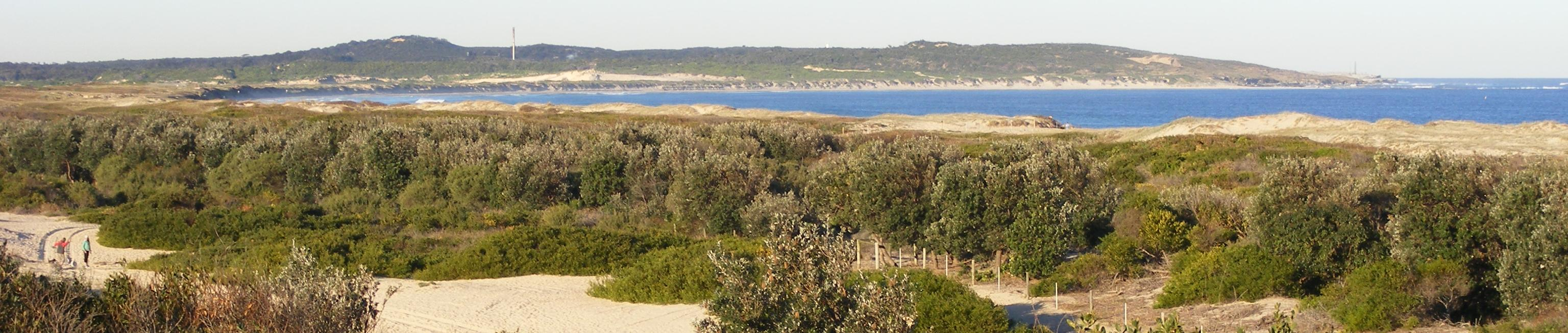
Panoramic view looking northeast

== See also ==
- Beaches in Sydney
- Cronulla sand dunes
