= Arthur Freeman =

Arthur Freeman may refer to:

- Arthur Freeman, pen name of Aaron Liebermann (1840–1880), Russian Jewish writer
- Arthur Freeman (cricketer) (1871–1948), English cricketer
- Arthur Phillip Freeman (born 1972), Australian convicted murderer
- Arthur Freeman (jockey) (1926–1988), English jockey who won the 1958 Grand National
- Artie Freeman (1887–1973), Australian rules footballer
