= Crimes That Shook Australia =

- Genre: Documentary; True crime
- Presented by: Stan Grant; Matt Doran
- Composer: Chaz DaBat Kkoshi
- Country of origin: Australia
- Original language: English
- No. of seasons: 3
- No. of episodes: 24

Production
- Producer: Amelia Hunter

Original release
- Network: Crime + Investigation
- Release: 16 April 2014 – present

Crimes That Shook Australia is an Australian true crime documentary television series that premiered on Crime + Investigation on 16 April 2014. Stan Grant presented the first two series; Matt Doran was announced as the new presenter in February 2017.

== Production ==
As with similar true crime documentaries, Crimes That Shook Australia explores some of Australia's most famous crimes, and details "the events leading up to the crime, the crime itself and its enduring effect on the national consciousness" through interviews, reconstructions and archival footage.

== Episodes ==
=== Series 1 ===
The first series of six episodes premiered in April 2014.

| Episode | Title | Air date | Notes |
|---|---|---|---|
| 1 | "Ebony Simpson" | 16 April 2014 | |
| 2 | "The Port Arthur Tragedy" | 23 April 2014 | |
| 3 | "Peter Norris Dupas" | 30 April 2014 | |
| 4 | "Jason Alexander Downie" | 7 May 2014 | |
| 5 | "Katherine Mary Knight" | 14 May 2014 | |
| 6 | "Derek Ernest Percy" | 21 May 2014 | |

=== Series 2 ===
A second series began airing in May 2016.

| Episode | Title | Air date | Notes |
|---|---|---|---|
| 1 | "Robert Farquharson" | 29 May 2016 | |
| 2 | "Peter Falconio" | 5 June 2016 | |
| 3 | "The Strathfield Massacre" | 12 June 2016 | |
| 4 | "Darcey Freeman" | 19 June 2016 | |
| 5 | "The Russell Street Bombing" | 26 June 2016 | |
| 6 | "The Murder of Raechel Betts" | 3 July 2016 | |
| 7 | "Hoddle Street Massacre" | 10 July 2016 | |
| 8 | "Gerard Baden Clay" | 17 July 2016 | |

=== Series 3 ===
The third series premiered in mid-February 2018.

| Episode | Title | Air date | Notes |
|---|---|---|---|
| 1 | "Snowtown: The Bodies In the Barrels Murders" | 18 February 2018 | |
| 2 | "The Bega Schoolgirl Murders" | 25 February 2018 | |
| 3 | "The Queen Street Massacre" | 4 March 2018 | |
| 4 | "Matthew Milat" | 11 March 2018 | |
| 5 | "Anu Singh" | 18 March 2018 | |
| 6 | "Morgan Huxley" | 25 March 2018 | |
| 7 | "Raymond Edmunds" | 1 April 2018 | |
| 8 | "Patricia Byers" | 8 April 2018 | |
| 9 | "The Walsh Street Massacre" | 15 April 2018 | |
| 10 | "Jill Meagher" | 22 April 2018 | |
