= Derek Percy =

Australian serial killer

- Born: Derek Ernest Percy; 15 September 1948; Strathfield, New South Wales, Australia
- Died: 23 July 2013 (aged 64); St Vincent's Hospital, Melbourne, Victoria, Australia
- Occupation: Electrical mechanic in the Australian Navy
- Parent(s): Ernest Percy (father), Elaine Percy (mother)
- Status: Deceased
- Conviction: Murder
- Criminal charge: Murder
- Penalty: Life imprisonment

Details
- Location: Victoria

Derek Ernest Percy (15 September 1948 – 23 July 2013) was an Australian serial killer and convicted child killer who was also a person of interest linked to the mysterious deaths and disappearances of multiple children in the 1960s, including the Beaumont disappearances and the Wanda Beach murders.

== Early life ==
Derek Percy was born on 15 September 1948 in Strathfield, New South Wales, the eldest of four sons of parents Ernest and Elaine Percy. Percy's father, a sailing enthusiast, had been a New South Wales railway electrician before taking a job with the State Electricity Commission in Victoria, and moving to Chelsea in 1954, then to Warrnambool in 1957, and to Mount Beauty, near Bright, in 1961.

Percy began to attract the attention of authorities in late 1964, when he started stealing and wearing female underwear and dresses and mutilating dolls with knives and razor blades. In 1965, the family relocated to Khancoban in New South Wales (their sixth move in twelve years) where Percy began writing down bizarre and violent sexual fantasies. In 1966, he repeated year 11, then tried year 12 in school, but dropped out and joined the Australian Navy as a naval rating in electrical mechanics in November 1967. He was posted to the aircraft carrier HMAS Melbourne in March 1968, the troop ship HMAS Sydney on 1 July 1968, and HMAS Cerberus naval base in April 1969.

== Criminal investigation ==
Percy was arrested at Cerberus, adjacent to Crib Point on the Mornington Peninsula south of Melbourne, for the murder of 12-year-old Yvonne Tuohy at Ski Beach, near Warneet on Westernport Bay, on 27 July 1969. At the time he abducted Tuohy at knife-point, he also tried to abduct her friend, Shane Spiller, age 11, who only escaped by threatening Percy with his tomahawk. Spiller, however, was able to describe to police the abductor and his vehicle, an orange Datsun station wagon with a navy sticker on the back window and bumper. Police, accompanied by Spiller, then went to Cerberus and discovered Percy machine-washing blood off his clothes. When questioned, Percy denied involvement, but eventually led police to Tuohy's mutilated body in a paddock on Fisheries Road at Devon Meadows, some 8 kilometres (5 mi) from the abduction scene. Police also found Percy's journals describing and illustrating his bizarre sexual fetishes (including coprophilia, urophilia, and cannibalism). In 1970, he was found not guilty, by reason of insanity, of the murder and remanded indefinitely.

Percy repeatedly stated that he could not remember whether or not he had committed any further crimes. Detectives then started trying to piece together his movements around Australia at the time of the murders. They were aware the Percy family often took caravan holidays during yachting regattas near beaches (where most of the crimes took place), that his transfers within the navy brought him close to many of the crime scenes, and they knew that he was harbouring paedophilic and psychopathic fantasies towards children. In 2007, a cache of 35 boxes of Percy's diaries, drawings, maps, and newspaper clippings was found in a storage unit in South Melbourne, casting further suspicion on him.

=== Related cases ===
Due to the nature of the Tuohy attack, and based on documents in his possession, Percy became a suspect in a number of other unsolved crimes involving children:

- Wanda Beach case (11 January 1965) – Percy was known to be visiting his friend's grandparents in Ryde at the time, at a house near to the homes of the victims. Based on identikits, witnesses recalled seeing a young man resembling Percy talking with the two girls on a train and at Wanda Beach, and he was considered a leading suspect for the murders by the police.
- Beaumont case (26 January 1966) – Percy admitted to being at Glenelg Beach in Adelaide on a family trip on the day of the Beaumont children's disappearance, but denied any involvement.
- Allen Redston case (28 September 1966) – Canberra police issued a description of a fair, thin-faced teenager that they wanted to interview, and also released an identikit image that closely resembled Percy. Percy later told police he had been in the capital, but that he was unable to remember any details.
- Simon Brook case (18 May 1968) – Percy had been stationed at the Cockatoo Dry Dock on Sydney Harbour at the time, and an Identikit of the suspect who killed and mutilated the 3-year-old was similar to the Redston suspect. A new inquest was held in 2005 with Percy as the prime suspect, but stalled due to lack of evidence.
- Linda Stilwell case (10 August 1968) – In October 2014, a year after his death, Percy was formally ruled to have abducted and killed the 7-year-old, who disappeared while playing at the St Kilda foreshore in Melbourne. At the time, Percy had been transferred to Sydney, was on leave, and admitted to driving in the area.
- 12-year-old girl (1 April 1969) – attempted abduction while riding her bicycle near the Cerberus base. Victim identified Percy after the Tuohy incident.

== Death ==
Percy died from lung cancer in St Vincent's Hospital, Melbourne, on 23 July 2013, aged 64, without admitting to any further crimes. At the time, he was the longest serving prison inmate in Australia, some 44 years.

== Media ==
- Alan Whiticker (2008) Derek Percy: Australian Psycho
- Debi Marshall (2013) Lambs to the Slaughter
- Crimes That Shook Australia (2014) Derek Percy
- Radford University - Derek Ernest Percy “The Ghost, Spook, Phantom” (PDF)

== See also ==
- List of serial killers by country
