= Murder of Allen Redston =

1966 child murder in Canberra, Australia

Allen Geoffrey Redston
- The identification photo provided by police
- Born: 24 August 1960; Bendigo, Victoria, Australia
- Disappeared: 27 September 1966; Curtin, Canberra, Australian Capital Territory, Australia
- Status: Dead
- Died: 28 September 1966 (aged 6); Curtin, Canberra, Australian Capital Territory, Australia
- Cause of death: Asphyxiation
- Resting place: Woden Cemetery; 35.344°S 149.093°E
- Parents: Brian Geoffrey Redston (father); Violet Redston (mother)

Allen Geoffrey Redston was an Australian schoolboy who was kidnapped and murdered on 28 September 1966, having disappeared the previous day. Redston's assailant was never caught and his murder remains an infamous cold case in Canberra.

== Disappearance ==
On 27 September 1966, Allen Redston was sent by his mother to buy ice cream for himself and his brother from the local shops in the Canberra suburb of Curtin. However, Redston sent his brother away and headed to his friend's house, planning to spend the day at the Curtin tip. After waiting for a short period of time, Redston left the area and was not seen again until his body was discovered the next day.

Redston's body was discovered by police among the reeds in a creek bed in Curtin. He had been bound, strangled, wrapped in carpet and then moved to the location.

== Suspects ==
A manhunt began and quickly turned up the descriptions of two suspects: "a blond-haired youth, aged 13–15", and a young man. Both men were seen with Redston earlier that day and both were seen leaving the tip where Redston is believed to have been murdered. Two boys also came forward to report incidents earlier that year in which two men with the same description had bound and attempted to murder them in a similar way. The first boy was tied up and thrown in a lake, however he managed to free himself and swim to safety. The second was also bound but escaped with help from his friends. Neither incident had been reported to police until that point.

No one was ever charged with the crime. However, it was suspected that Allen Redston may have been a victim of serial killer Derek Percy. Percy claimed to have been vacationing in Canberra at that time but never admitted to the killing. He died in 2013.

== See also ==
- Murder of Graeme Thorne
- Murder of Daniel Morcombe
- List of kidnappings (1960–1969)
- List of unsolved murders (1900–1979)
