= Shelly Beach (Cronulla) =

Beach in Sydney, Australia

- Beach
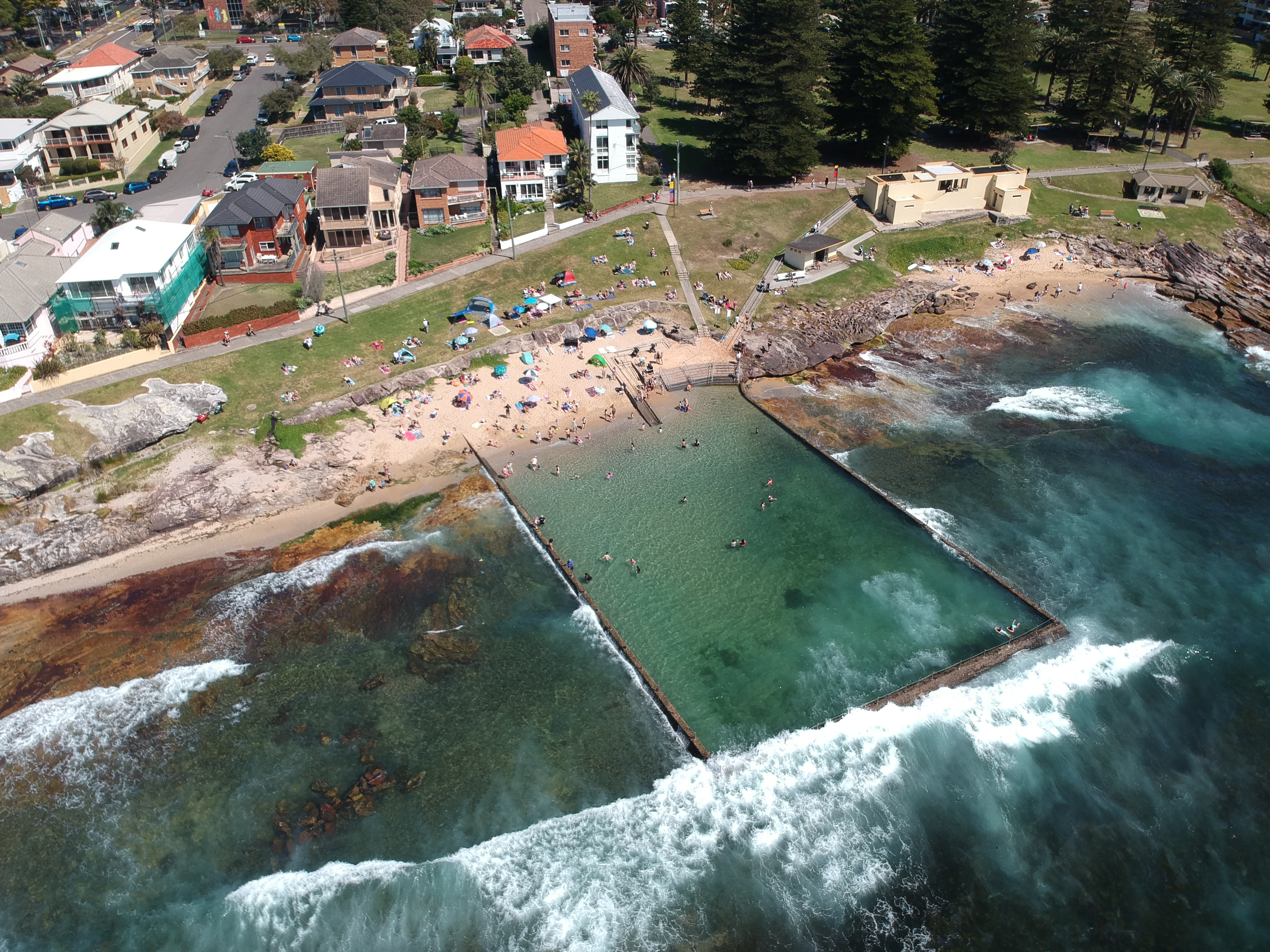
- Shelly Beach aerial view
- Interactive map of Shelly Beach
- Coordinates: 34°03′51″S 151°09′20″E
- Location: Cronulla, Sydney, New South Wales, Australia

Dimensions
  - Length: 40 m (130 ft)
- Hazard rating: 3/10 (least hazardous)
- Access: Ewos Parade (road); The Esplande (foot)

Shelly Beach is a beach on Bate Bay in Cronulla, Sydney, New South Wales, Australia. Shelly Park sits behind the beach. Shelly Pavilion is located between the beach and the park.

== History ==
The name Shelly Beach is derived from the sea shells in the area.

== Gallery ==
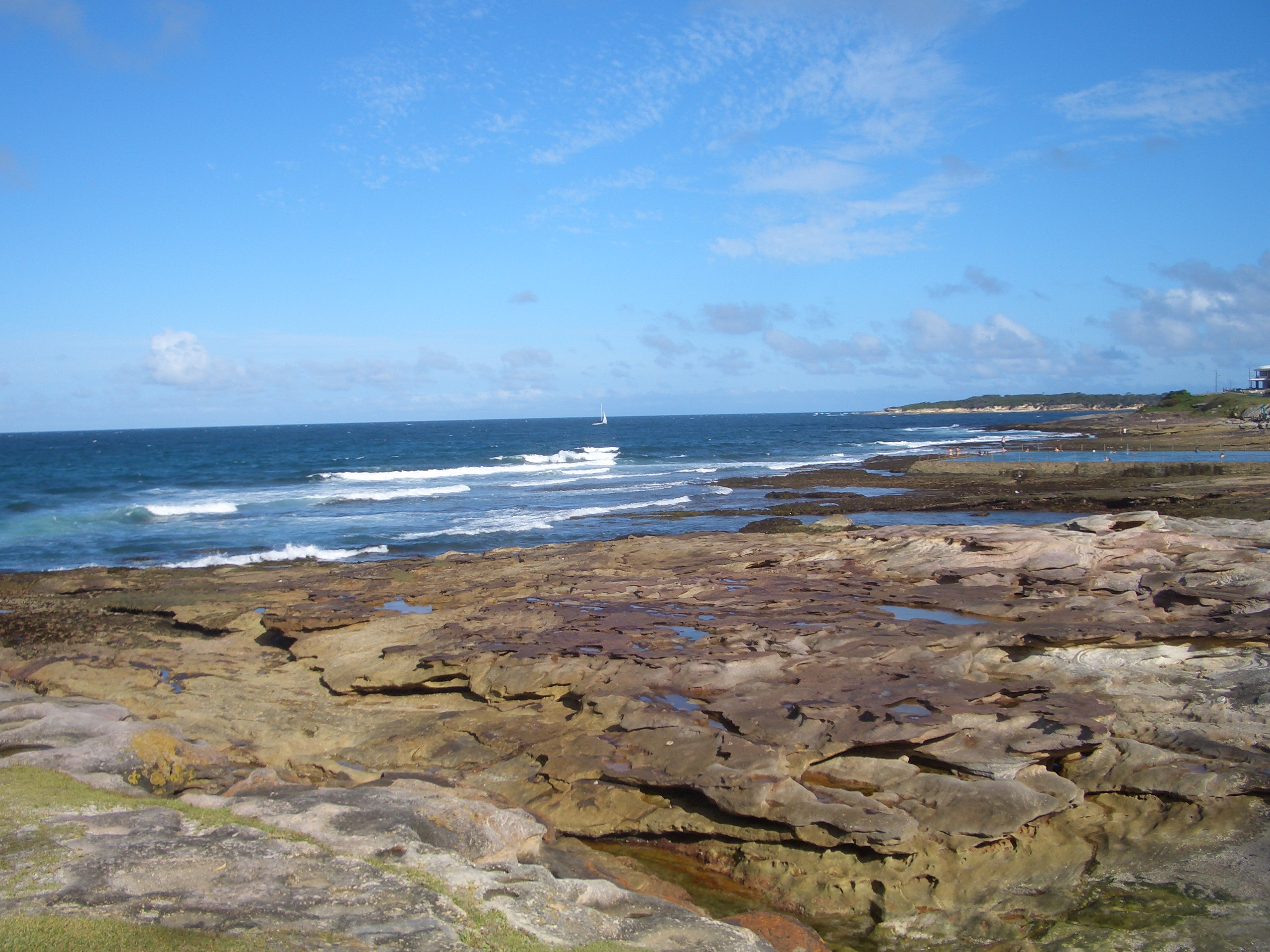
Shelly Beach

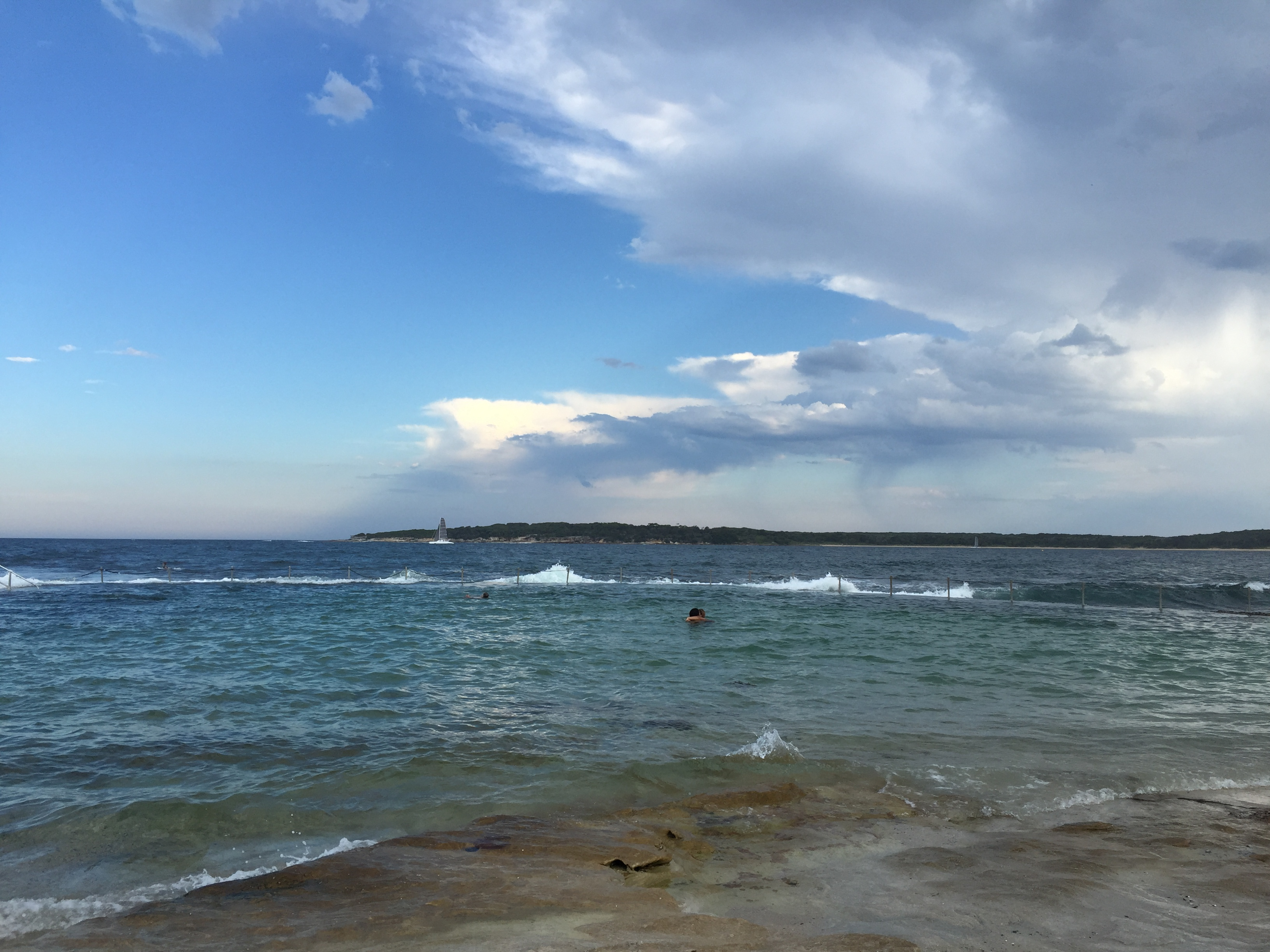

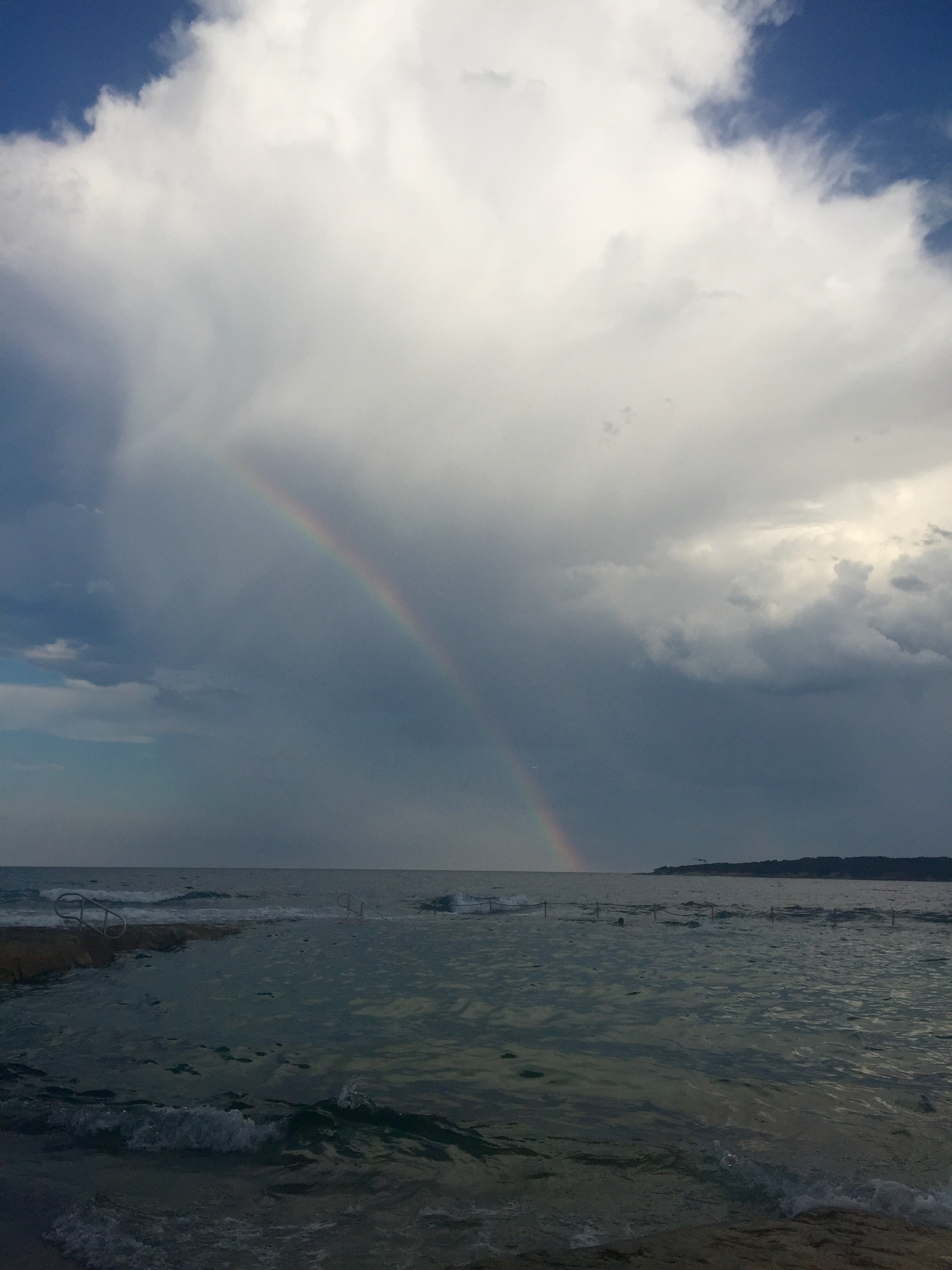

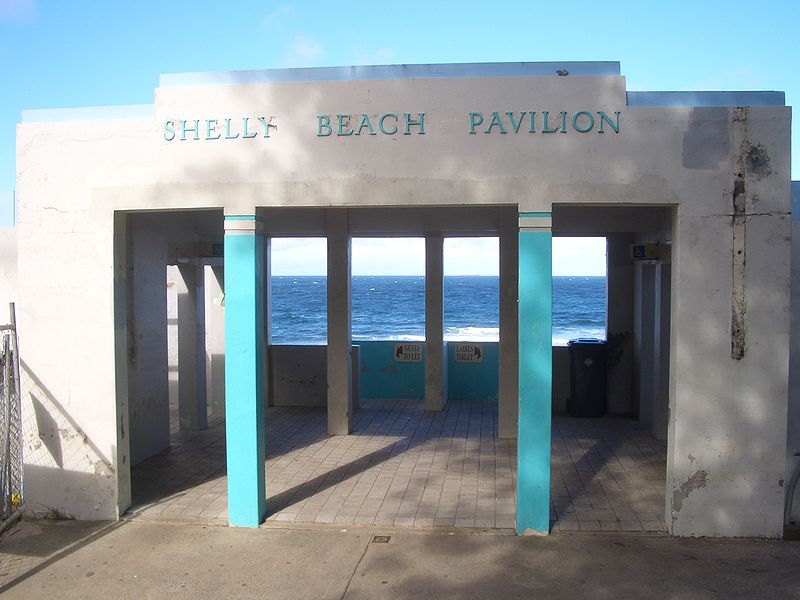
Shelly Beach Pavilion

== See also ==
- Beaches in Sydney
- Wanda Sand dunes
