= Greenhills Beach, New South Wales =

Greenhills Beach
- Suburb
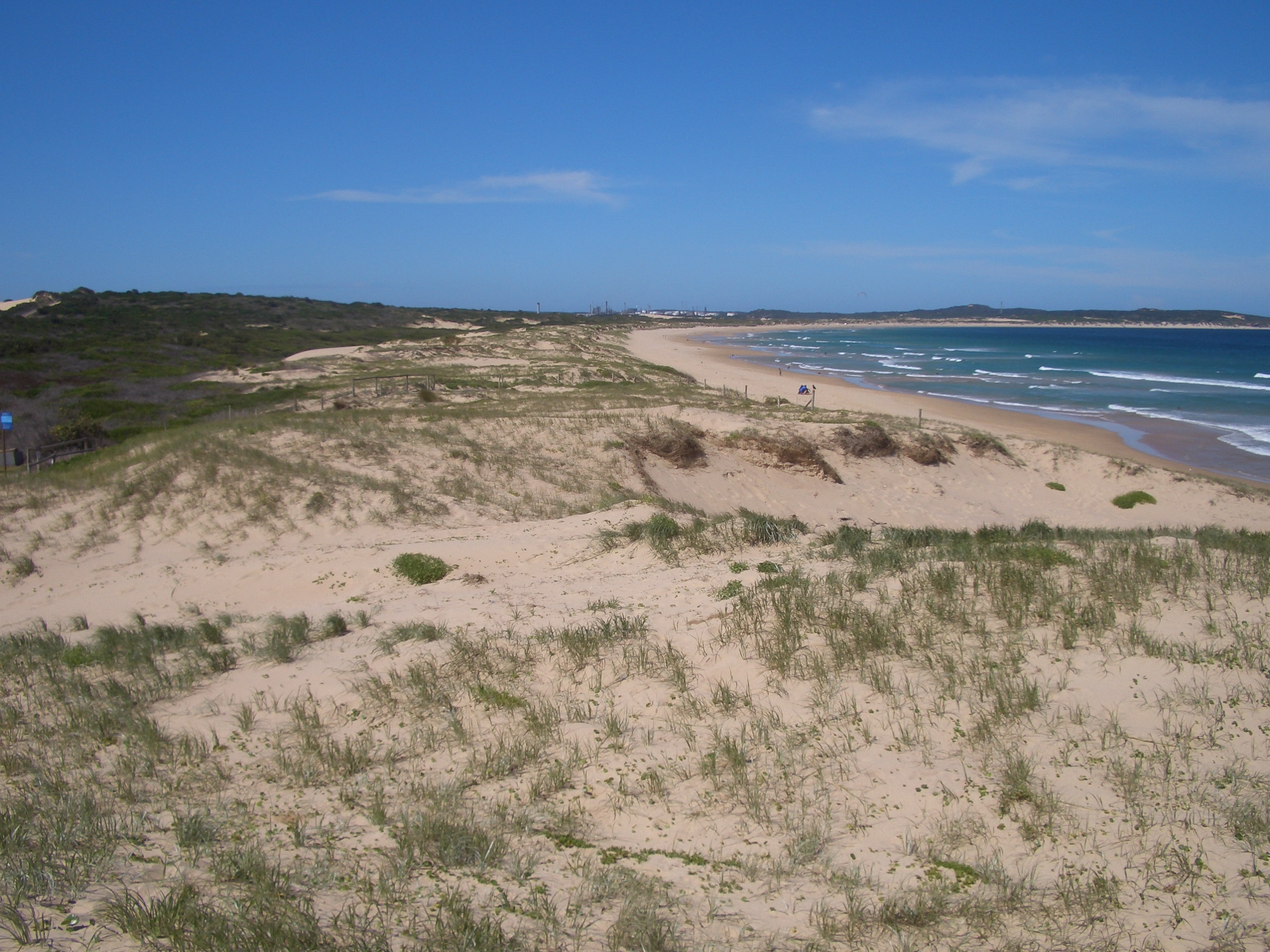
- Green Hills Sand Dunes

- Interactive map of Greenhills Beach
- Coordinates: 34°02′05″S 151°09′53″E
- Country: Australia
- State: New South Wales
- City: Sydney
- LGA: Sutherland Shire
- Location: 24 km (15 mi) S of Sydney CBD
- Established: 2011

Government
  - State electorate: Cronulla
  - Federal division: Cook
- Elevation: 7 m (23 ft)

Population
  - Total: 1,375 (2021 census)
- Postcode: 2230
Suburbs around Greenhills Beach
Kurnell	Kurnell	Kurnell
Kurnell	Greenhills Beach	Bate Bay
Cronulla	Cronulla	Bate Bay

Greenhills Beach is a beachside suburb, in southern Sydney, in the state of New South Wales, Australia in the local government area of Sutherland Shire. Nearby are countless bike tracks, Cronulla Sand Dunes, Greenhills Beach and Wanda Park.

== History ==
Formerly part of Kurnell, Greenhills Beach was designated a suburb in 2011 following the approval of new residential development, in the locality known as Green Hills.
