= Kurnell =

- Suburb
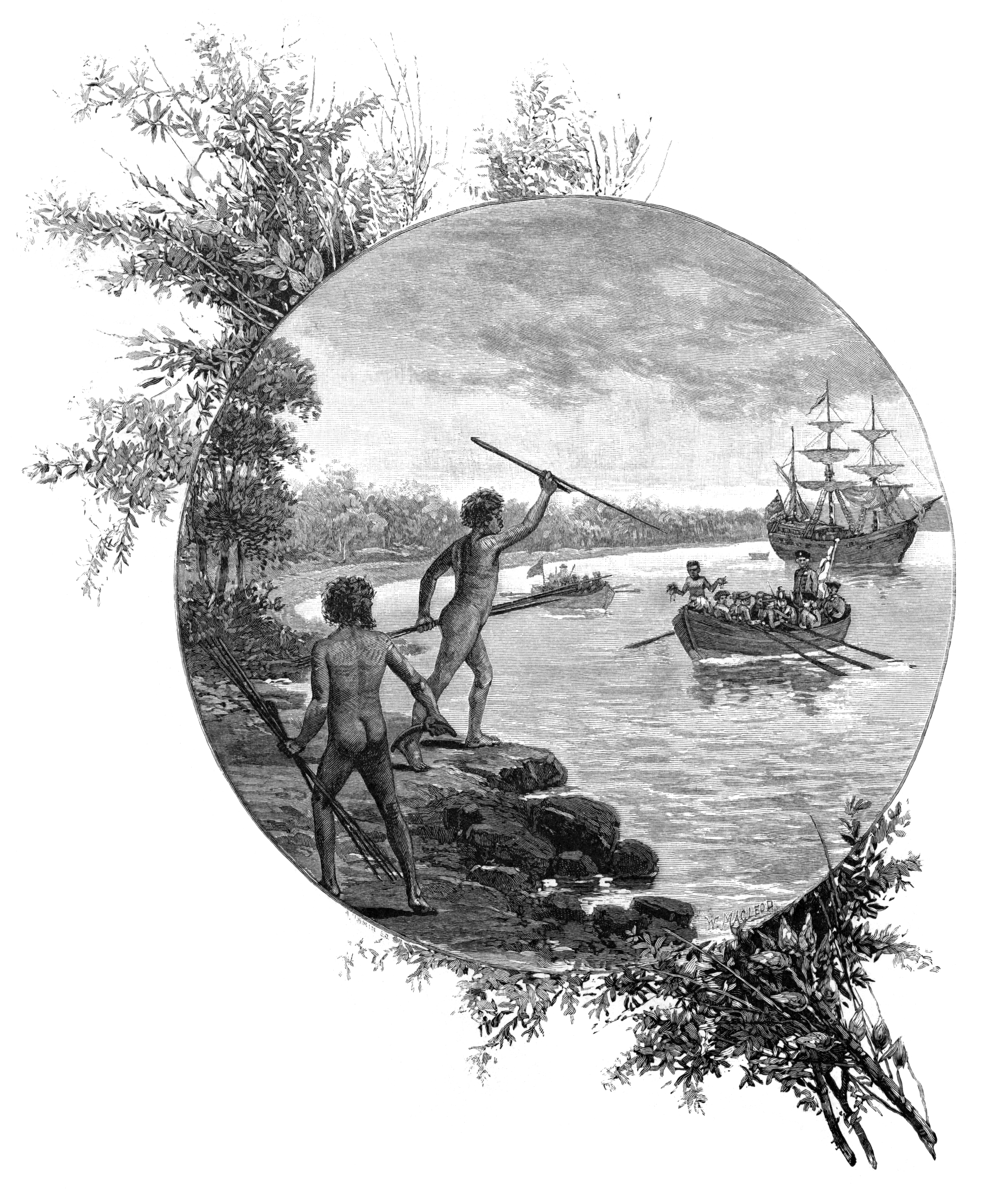
- Artwork depicting two Gweagal opposing the landing of James Cook and crew

- Interactive map of Kurnell
- Country: Australia
- State: New South Wales
- City: Sydney
- LGA: Sutherland Shire
- Location: 22 km (14 mi) S of Sydney CBD

Government
  - State electorate: Cronulla
  - Federal division: Cook
- Elevation: 19 m (62 ft)

Population
  - Total: 2,528 (2021 census)
- Postcode: 2231
Suburbs around Kurnell
Port Botany	Phillip Bay	La Perouse
Woolooware	Kurnell	Pacific Ocean
Cronulla	Greenhills Beach	Bate Bay

Kurnell is a suburb in Sydney, in the state of New South Wales, Australia. It is 21.4 kilometres (13.3 mi) south of the Sydney central business district, in the local government area of the Sutherland Shire along the east coast. Kurnell is adjacent to the suburbs of Cronulla, Woolooware and Greenhills Beach. La Perouse is located opposite, on the northern headland of Botany Bay. The Cronulla sand dunes are on the south eastern headland of Botany Bay. The eastern side of the peninsula is part of Botany Bay National Park, and Towra Point Nature Reserve is located on the western side of the suburb. Residents are affectionately known as ‘Kurnellians’.

== History ==
Kurnell is the place where Lieutenant James Cook and his crew landed on 29 April 1770, making first contact with the Gweagal people, the original inhabitants of the area, whilst navigating his way up the East Coast of Australia on Endeavour.

Two Gweagal men challenged the landing and gestured with their spears. Cook's party attempted to communicate their desire for water, but the two men continued to oppose the landing and Cook fired a shot which wounded one of the Aboriginal warriors and forced them to flee.

Cook and his men stayed at Kurnell for a period of eight days. During their time there they collected botanical specimens and mapped the area. When Cook reported back to England he said that the land was suitable for agriculture and was lightly wooded.

Captain Arthur Phillip arrived in H.M. Armed Tender Supply on 18 January 1788, before the First Fleet arrived, following Cook's advice. They began to clear land and dig wells, near modern-day La Perouse, but a week later Phillip decided to abandon the site and moved north to Sydney Cove at Port Jackson.

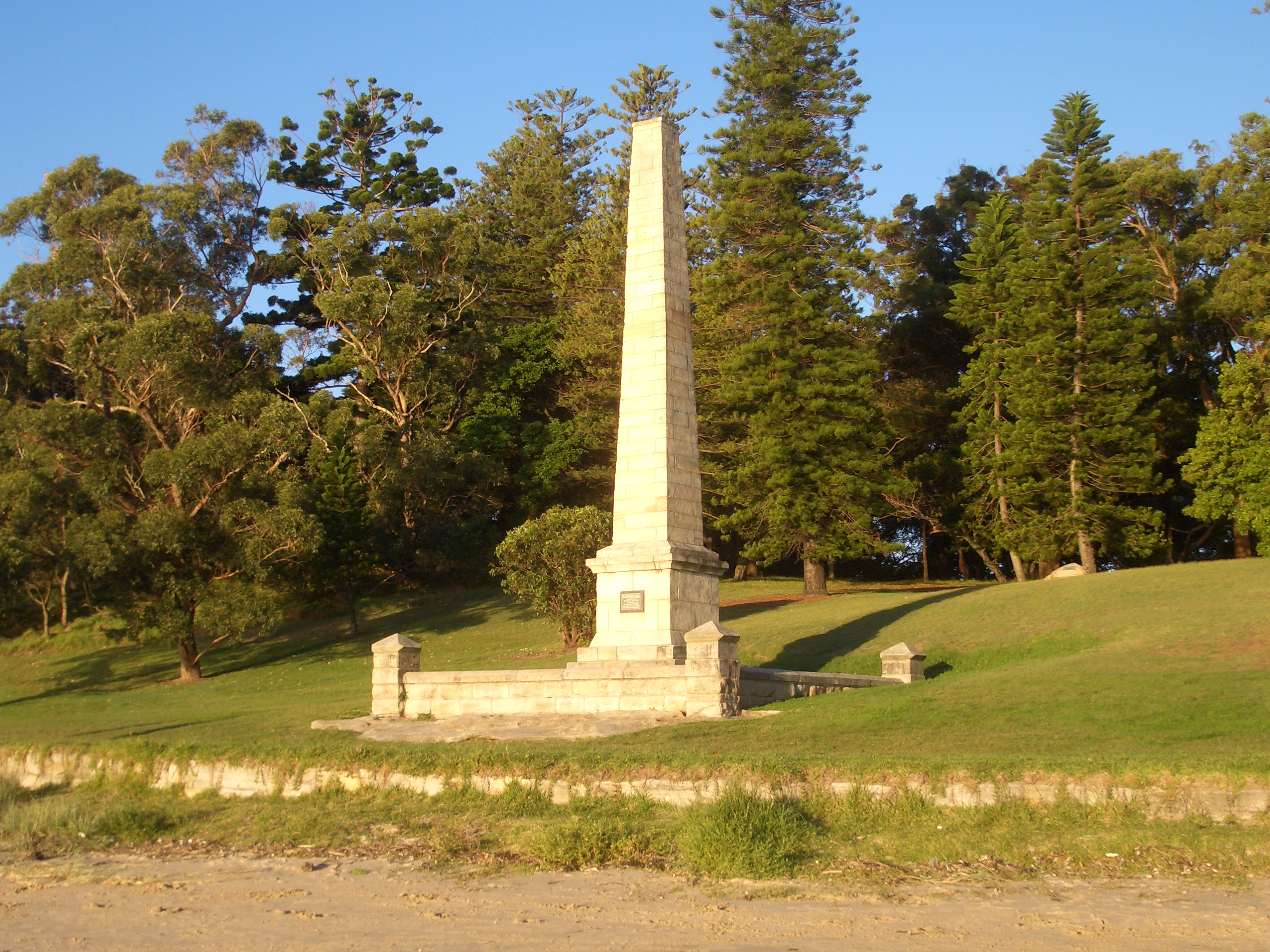
Captain Cook Memorial Obelisk

Cook's landing place is located on the north-eastern part of the national park, just near Silver Beach. Sutherland Point is named in honour of a crew member, Scotsman Forby Sutherland, who died of tuberculosis during their eight days here and was buried on the shore. Cape Solander is named after Swedish botanist Daniel Solander, a colleague of Joseph Banks.^{[a]} Inscription Point was named by the Australian Philosophical Society in 1822 when they secured a plaque to the cliff face to mark the point of the Endeavour's crew first landing.

Dampier Street, Tasman Street and Torres Street commemorate other navigators in Australia's history.

The first land grant of 700 acres (283 ha) was made in 1815, to Captain James Birnie, who established Alpha Farm. "Alpha" is the first letter in the Greek alphabet, and the name was thought appropriate for the first farm in the area. In 1821 John Connell Junior was also granted land here and used it for timber getting. His father purchased Alpha Farm from Birnie and by 1842 the Connell family's estate was over one thousand acres (4 km^{2}) in size. In 1860, Alpha Farm was sold to Thomas Holt (1811–88), who owned most of the land that stretched from Sutherland to Cronulla. The area was known as Birniemere for a time and Holtmere was once a locality.

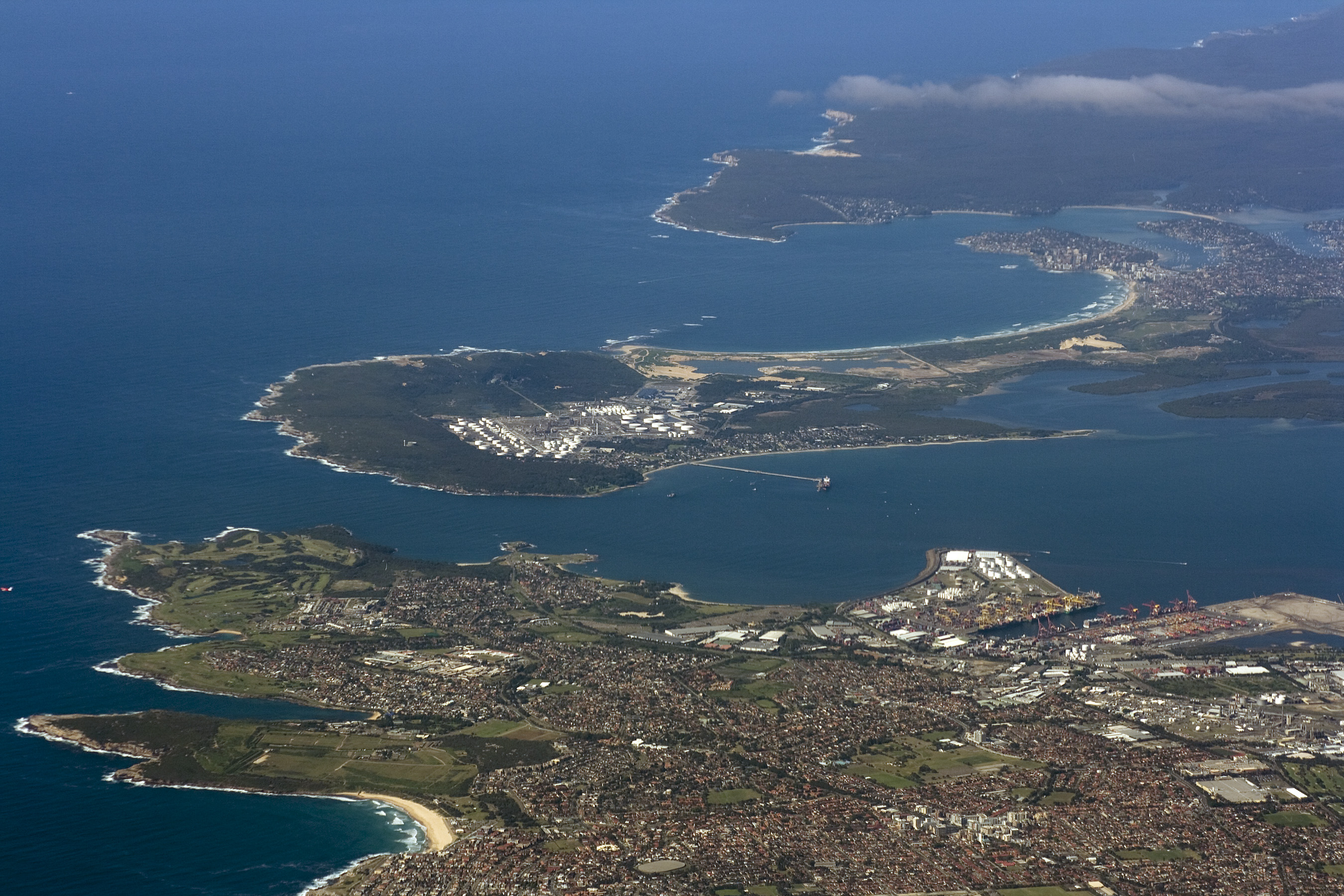
Kurnell peninsula from air

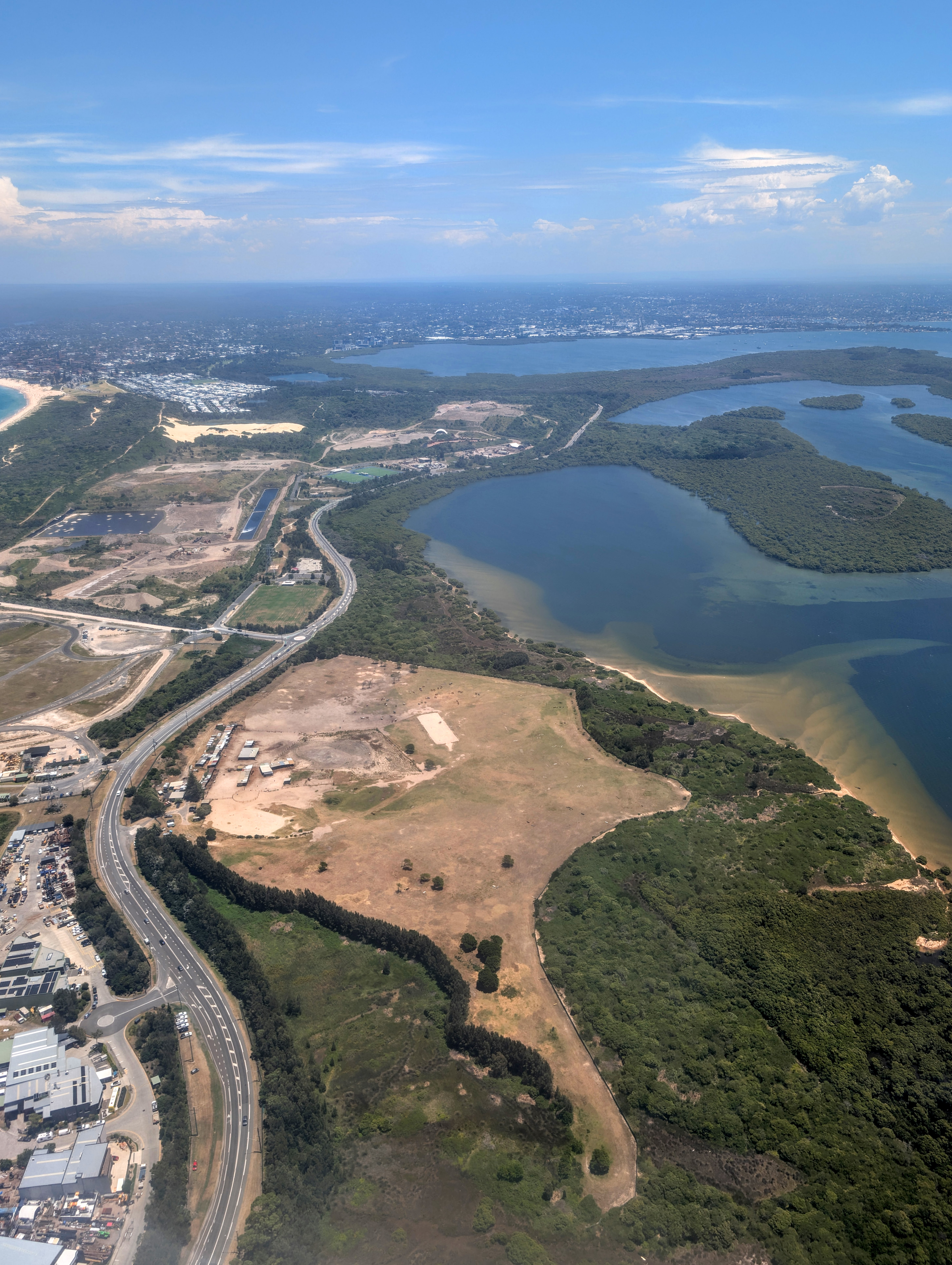
Aerial view along Captain Cook Drive, Kurnell

Before the 1920s, Kurnell was used by fishermen as schools of several varieties of fish inhabited the Botany Bay foreshore and the open sea. Fishermen built numerous huts and shacks which sheltered them for the weekend fishing. During the Great Depression, from the late 1920s, many severely affected low-income families took up residence there, in a shantytown.

=== 2015 storm ===
On 16 December 2015 a supercell tracked along New South Wales coast producing a strong F2 tornado, high rainfall, hailstones and unusually strong winds. Kurnell was particularly hard hit at about 10:30 am with homes and businesses un-roofed, sewerage and electricity cut, two trucks tipped on their sides, and workers evacuated from Kurnell Refinery and the desalination plant, which was damaged. A "Wind gust of 213 km/h recorded in Kurnell at 10:33am," was "the fastest wind speed recorded in NSW history". Injuries to people were only minor. The damage to Kurnell was calculated to have cost insurers A$206 million. Elsewhere on the same day roof damage occurred at Westfield Bondi Junction and in South Nowra. Thousands of homes lost power in Bulli, Thirroul and Woonona north of Wollongong.

== Name ==
It is possibly a corruption of a Dharug term "cunthal", "kundle" or "koondool", perhaps meaning "place of or where the wild carrot grows". Alternatively it is an Aboriginal corruption of the surname of John Connell, who was granted land in the area in 1821.

== Heritage listings ==
Kurnell has a number of heritage-listed sites, including:

- Cape Solander Drive: Kamay Botany Bay National Park

== Population ==
In the 2021 Census, there were 2,528 people in Kurnell. 84.7% of people were born in Australia and 90.3% of people only spoke English at home. The most common responses for religion were No Religion 41.3%, Catholic 24.6% and Anglican 17.8%.

== Places of interest ==
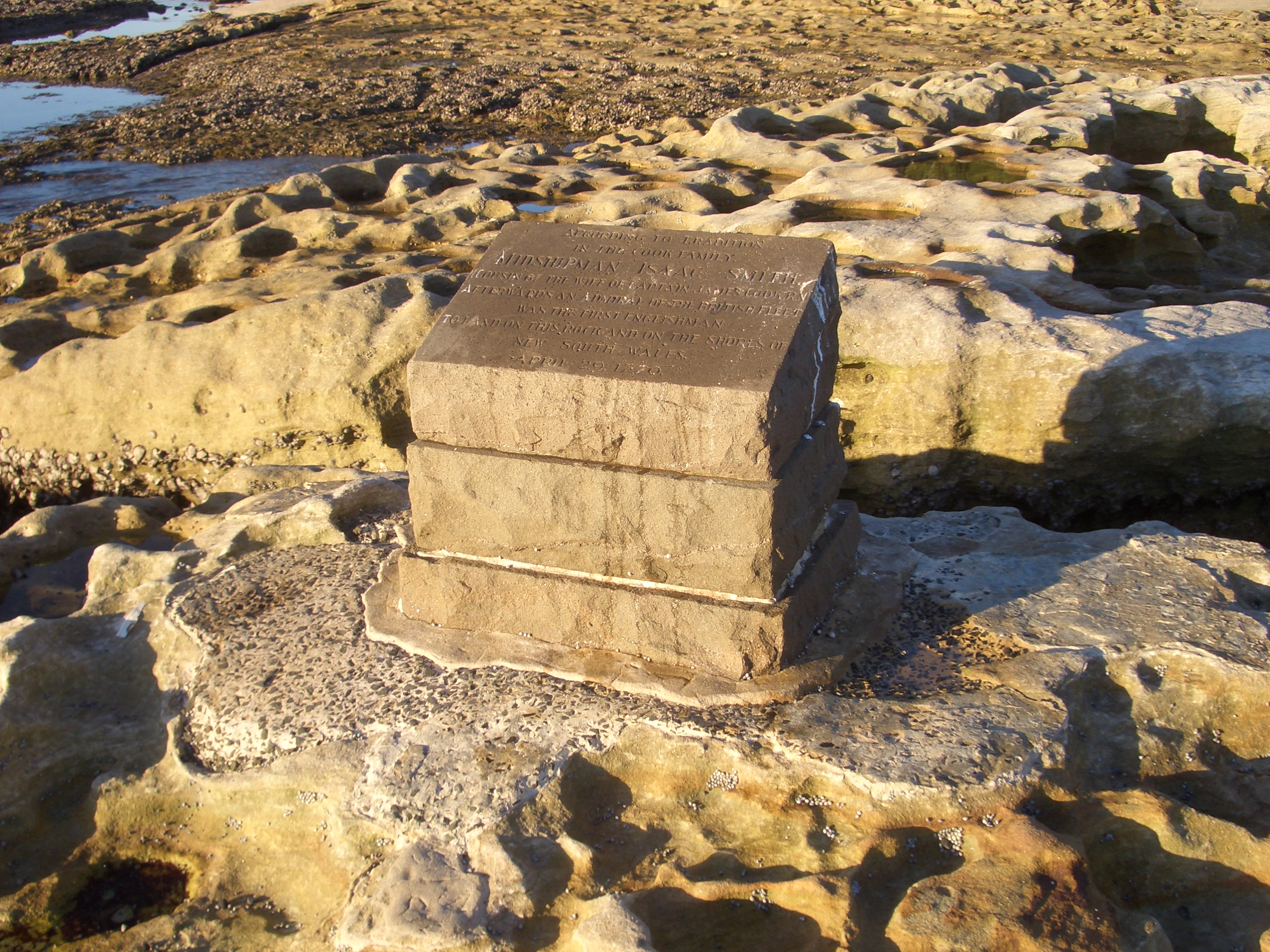
Captain Cook's Landing Place monument. "According to tradition in the Cook Family MIDSHIPMAN ISAAC SMITH cousin of the wife of Captain James Cook R.N. afterwards an Admiral of the English Fleet was the first Englishman to land on this rock and on the shores of New South Wales. April 29, 1770."

The northern part of the peninsula is a historic site known as Captain Cooks Landing Place with a number of memorials located here:

- Captain Cook Memorial Obelisk
- Kamay Botany Bay Discovery Centre
- Sir Joseph Banks Memorial
- Solander Monument
- Sutherland Monument
- Marton Park (Home of the mighty Kurnell Stingrays) on Game Day

The Discovery Centre provides information and displays relics from the early days in Kurnell's history. Endeavour Heights is a recreation area in the Botany Bay National Park. The Kurnell Lookout provides brilliant views of Botany Bay and the northern headland of Botany Bay at La Perouse. Cape Solander is popular amongst whale watchers during the migration season.

== Commercial areas ==
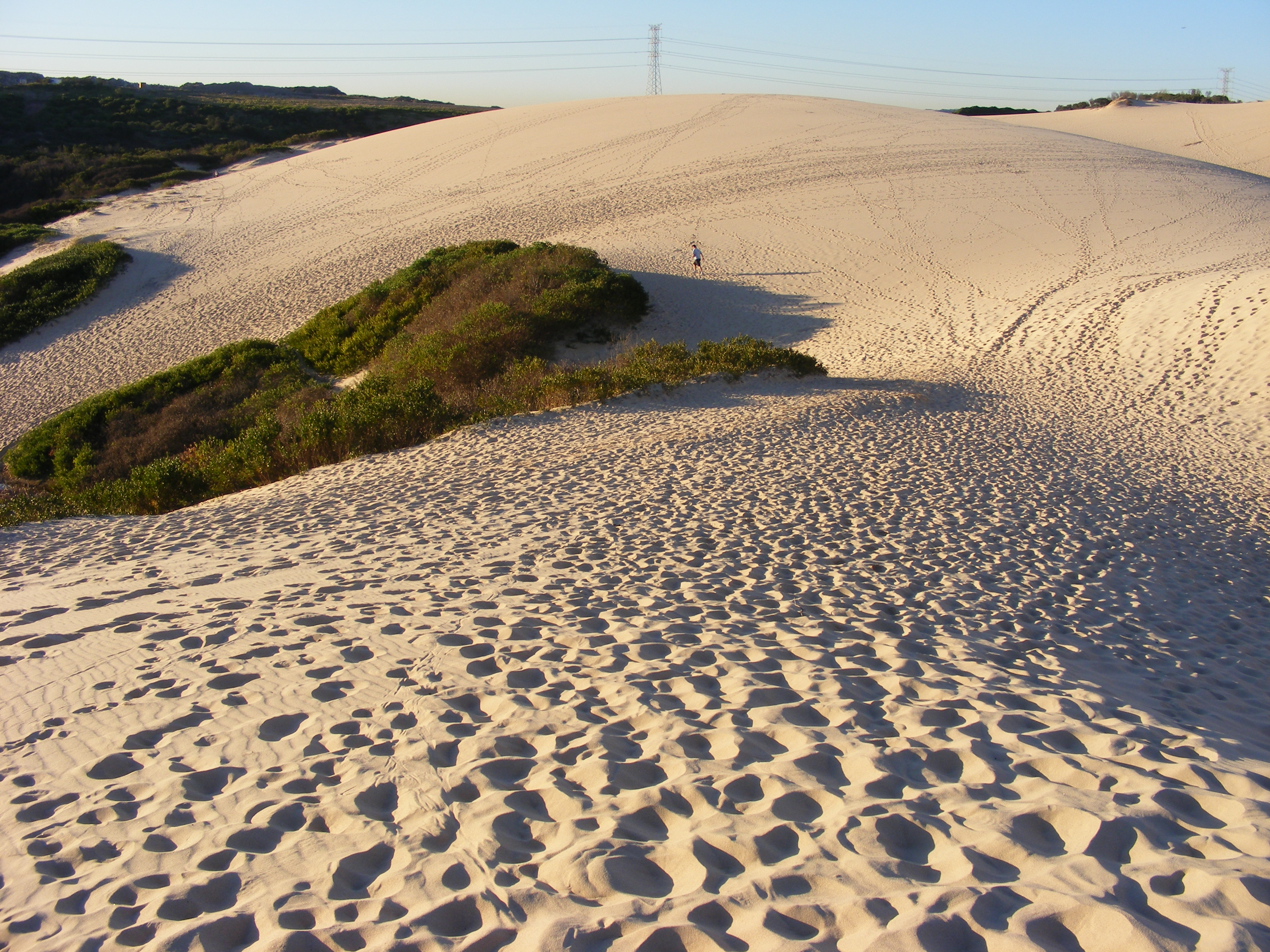
The Kurnell sand dunes

The small residential area with a population of 2,260 is located to the north with a small group of shops in the village of Kurnell. Sand mining on the peninsula has depleted the area of much of the sand that was originally there. It has been said that 40-metre deep pools now form in the dunes and are clearly visible in view from Google Earth. The remaining sand dune is used as a recreational off-road area for 4-wheel drives. The Cronulla sand dunes formed part of the location for the films Forty Thousand Horsemen, directed by Charles Chauvel in 1940 and Mad Max Beyond Thunderdome.

Kurnell is dominated by an industrial area, which once included the Caltex Oil Refinery which is now closed. It now functions as a bulk fuels import terminal to supply imported fuel for Australian customers. Refined petrol is piped to the other side of Botany Bay in an underwater pipeline. The Kurnell Desalination Plant, opened in 2010, now provides much of the rest of Sydney with an alternative water supply. It has been criticised on environmental grounds (greenhouse gases and impact of large amounts of deoxygenated brine), and was shelved, but was resumed after the March 2007 NSW state elections. Continued widespread protest by residential, environmental, and community groups was declared to be irrelevant. Immediate work began on a pipeline under Botany Bay to carry desalinated water to northern suburbs and the size of the desalination plant was doubled. The water supply of Kurnell is supplemented with bore water. Total water stored in the Sydney catchment was at a low of 36.9% on 7 June 2007 but rainfall increased volume stored to 64% as of 7 February 2008, before reaching over 98% capacity in March 2012.

== Transport ==
U-Go Mobility operates bus route 987 Kurnell to Cronulla.

=== Ferries ===
In the 1890s a ferry service began operating between Kurnell and La Perouse. It ceased in 1974 after storms damaged the wharves.

In February 2025 a new Kurnell ferry wharf opened. Two attempts to entice a private ferry operator to operate a service between Kurnlee and La Perouse have not been successful.

== Sport and recreation ==
Kurnell is home to the Stingrays JRLFC, one of the Shire's rugby league clubs. The name 'Stingrays' originates from Cook's own log when he first named Botany Bay 'Stingray Harbour'. The Kurnell Junior Rugby League Football Club was formed after a committee meeting on 17 November 1991 where local members of the community got together and decided it was time for Kurnell to have their own rugby league club. In all, seven teams took to the field for the 1992 season. The clubhouse in Marton Park was built using funds raised by the Kurnell Community and with skills and hard work from many locals. Currently there is an active membership in excess of 440 members, including players, volunteers and team staff. Today the Stingrays are fielding both male and female rugby league from the under 6's through to senior teams and League Tag teams from under 7 Girls League Tag through to Open Women's and Over 30 Women's and Over 35 Men's Tag. The Kurnell Stingrays has been awarded Club Of The Year in the Cronulla Junior League District three times (2014, 2018 and 2022) since the club's inception.

Kurnell Community Sports & Recreation Club (The Reccas) is a community-based social and sporting venue located in Kurnell, New South Wales, Australia. Established as a hub for the local community, the club provides facilities for dining, live entertainment, functions and recreational activities, and hosts a range of regular events including live music, trivia and community gatherings.The club operates as a central meeting place with a strong focus on community engagement, supporting local groups and charities. Its facilities include function spaces, a beer garden, dining venues and entertainment areas, contributing to its role as a key social and cultural centre for residents and visitors.

Marang Parklands Skate Park (sometimes referred to as Greenhills) is located in Kurnell on Captain Cook Drive. It has a bowl area featuring a large vertical transition, a street zone with stair sets and a snake run area that pays homage to the early days of skateboarding. Entry to the skate park is via Lindum Road (off Captain Cook Drive Roundabout) which will take you to the skate facility and adjacent car park.

Kurnell Village Fair has been running for over 25 years and brings together the local community to commemorate its diverse history. Held annually at Marton Park, this event brings together live music, stallholders from across NSW, food, and rides.

Triathlons are held in Kurnell annually, now in its 29th year, Australia's longest-running sprint series. In May 2026 it will host The Shire Run & Aquathon, a community festival with a light atmosphere, catering for both casual and competitive participants. The event takes place along the Kurnell Foreshore, with the main event site at Bonna Point Reserve. The event proudly supports the valuable work of the Love Mercy Foundation and Cronulla Surf Life Saving Club.

Muru and Yena tracks form a short 2.5 km loop walk and pass by Yena picnic area. Muru track to Yena picnic area is 1.2 km, Yena track to the picnic area is 1.3 km These are great for bushwalks or running tracks.

Silver Beach in Kurnell is a 2.8 km long, north-facing sandy beach on Botany Bay, offering calm waters, a netted tidal swimming area, and panoramic city views. It is popular for families, kite surfing, fishing, scuba diving and windsurfing. There is a dog off leash area between the third and fourth rock groynes at the western end of Silver Beach (Near the boat ramp at Bonna Point). Dogs are prohibited on Silver Beach at all other locations. Silver Beach is an unpatrolled beach.

Cape Solander in Kamay Botany Bay National Park, Kurnell, is a premier Sydney whale-watching spot, offering close-up views of migrating humpback whales just 200m offshore, peaking from June to July, with the season running May to October. The site features a new accessible, award-winning viewing platform There is a free shuttle bus service during whale watching season, departing from the parking area of the office of the National Park.

Halloween is a major community event in Kurnell, with multiple homes going all out on decorations and crowds of trick or treaters. The community fully embraces the event, with many houses creating spooky experiences, including a large walk through maze with scare actors on Dampier Street and a Fright Night event held at Cook@Kurnell.

Boat Harbour Beach (Entrance is found at the Greenhills Skate Park Roundabout on Captain Cook Drive) is the location of a 4WD park. People are permitted to drive on the beach with their 4WDs. An entry fee is required and one may drive along the beach for at least two kilometres.

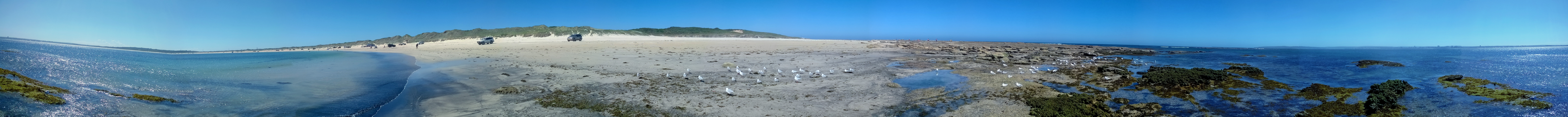
Kurnell Panorama.

== Gallery ==
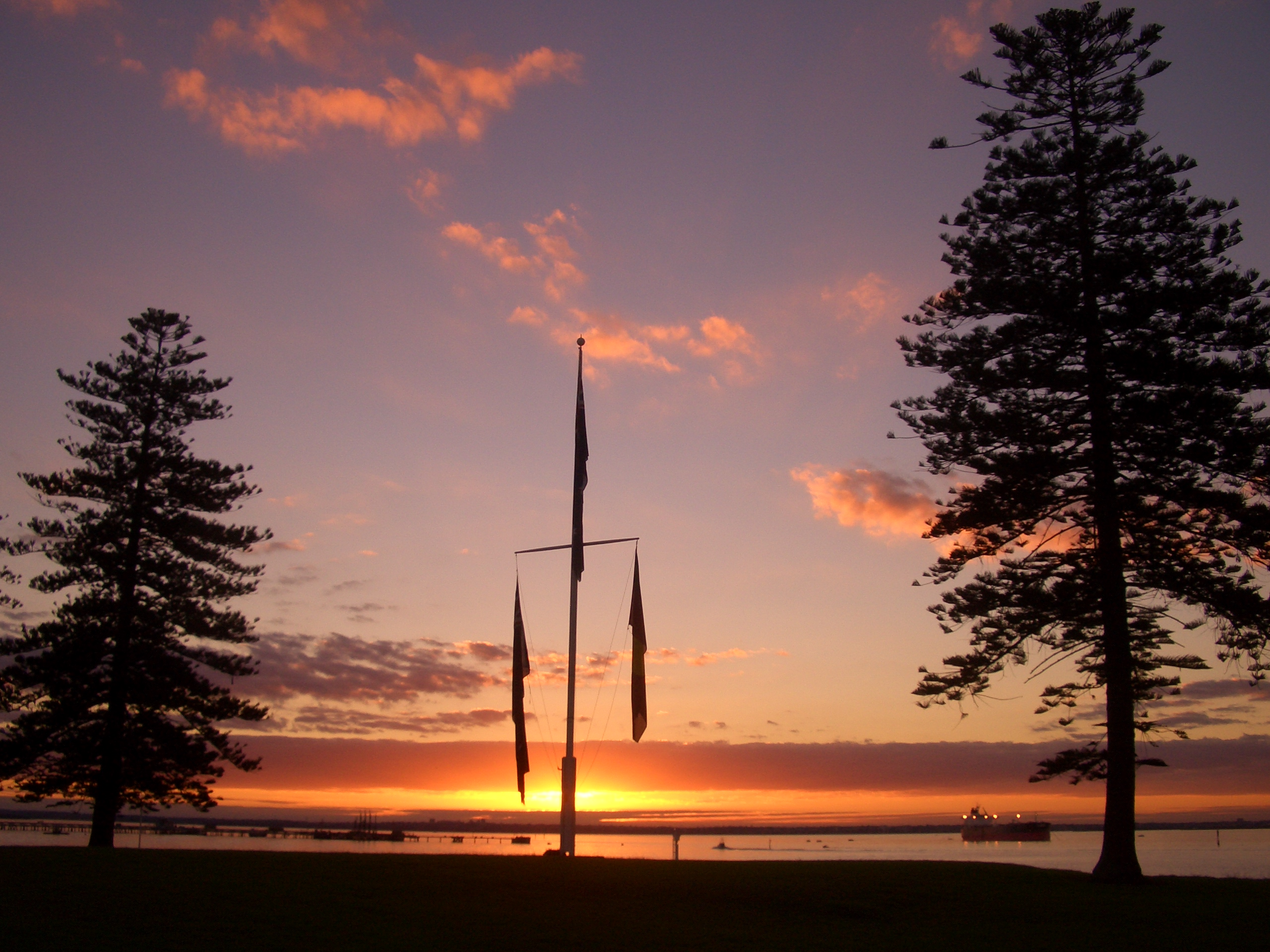
Kurnell flag masts at sunset

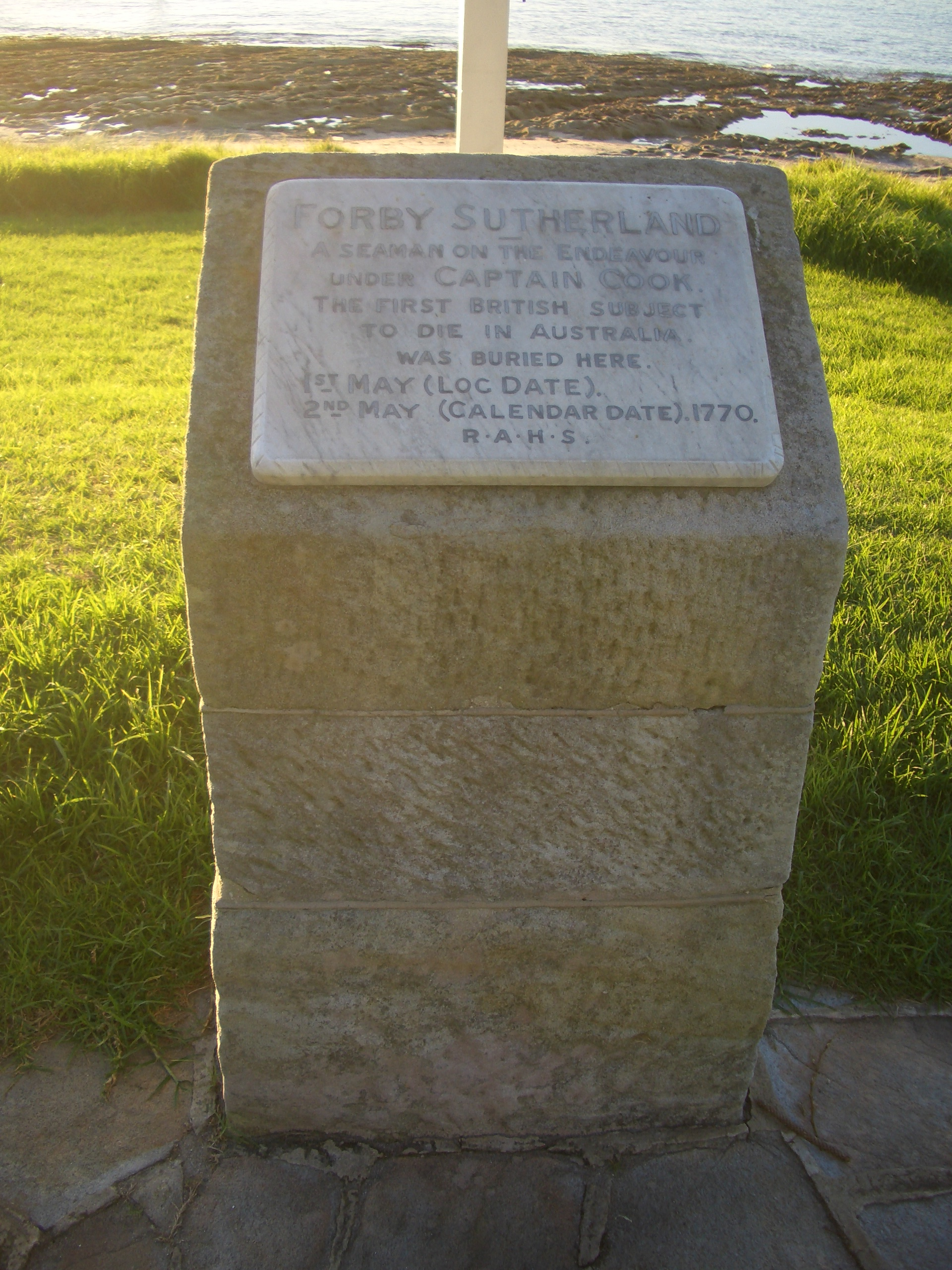
Sutherland's monument

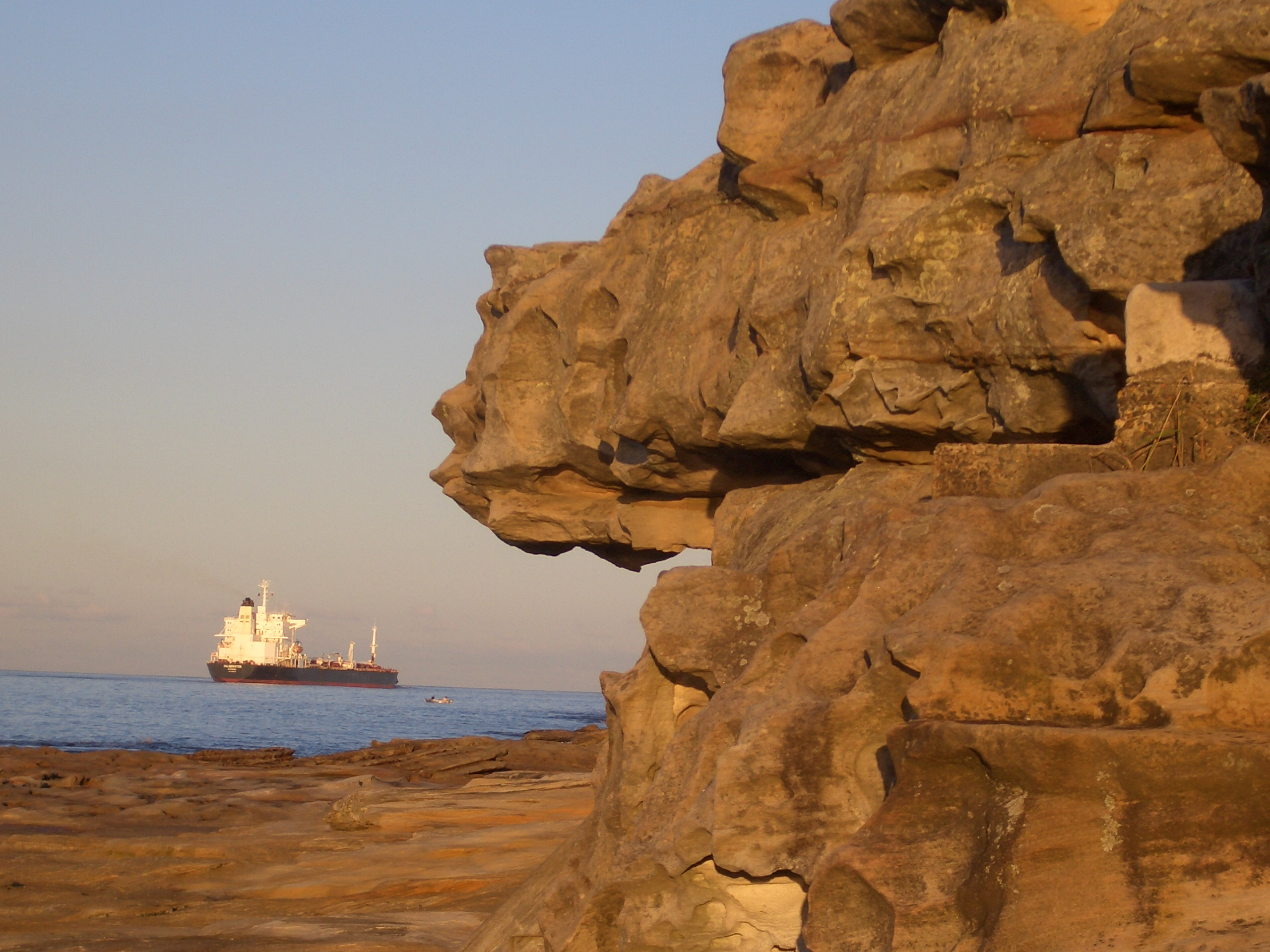
Kurnell sandstone cliffs, view towards Pacific Ocean

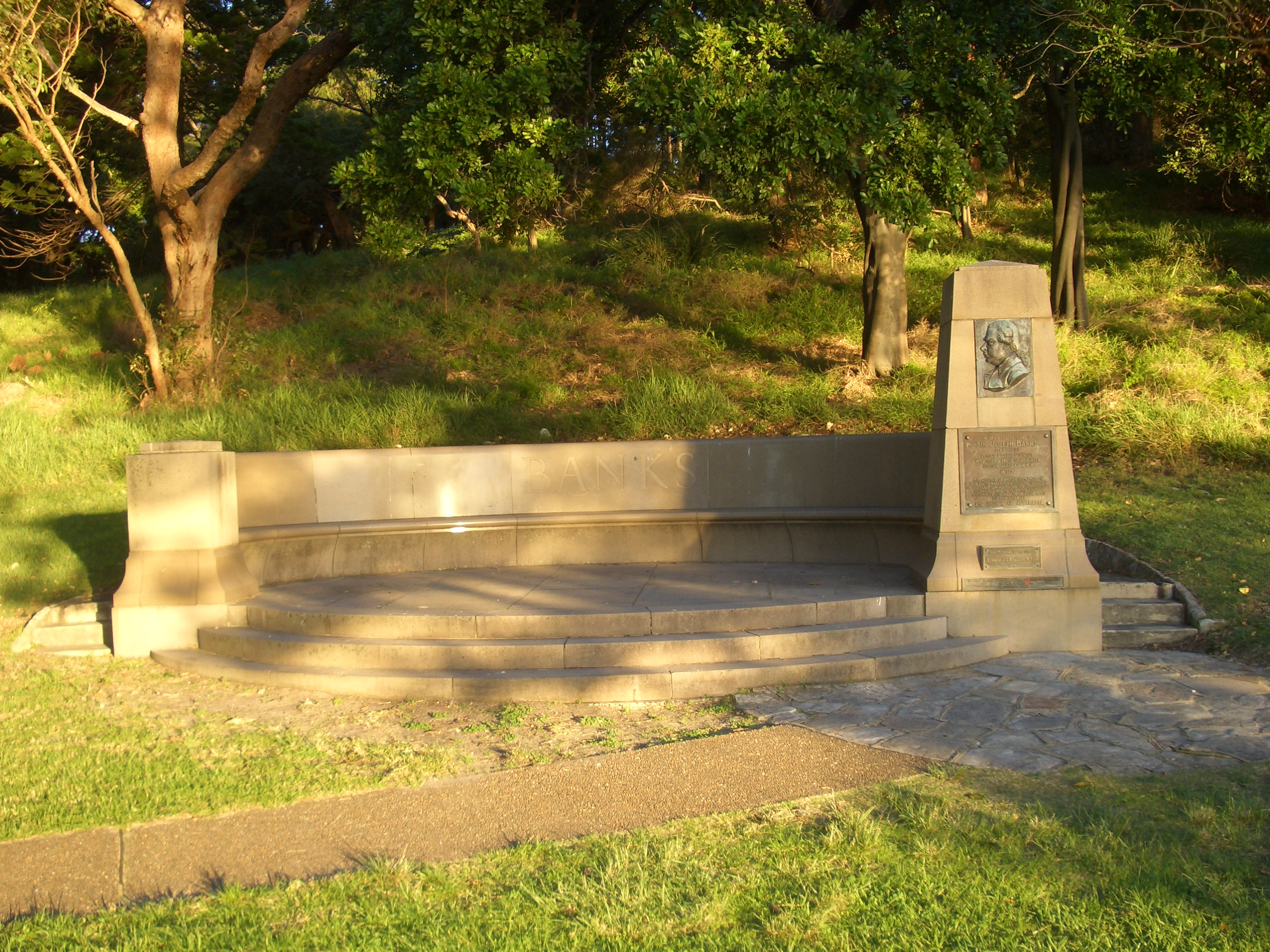
Sir Joseph Banks Memorial

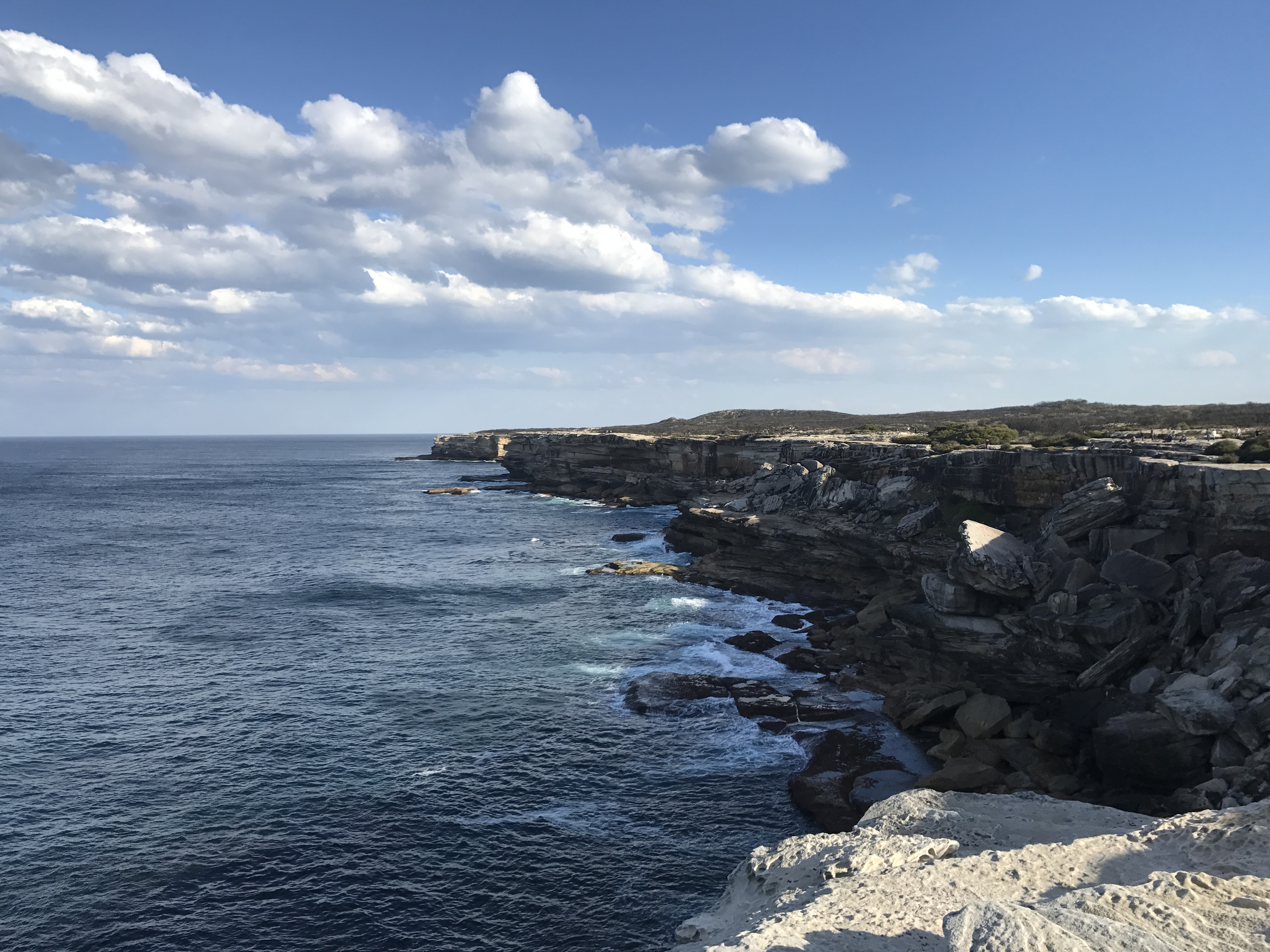
Cliff and Pacific Ocean view
