= Real Crime (Australian TV channel) =

- Country: Australia
- Broadcast area: Australia; New Zealand

Programming
- Language: English

Ownership
- Owner: Foxtel Networks
- Sister channels: Foxtel Networks channels

History
- Launched: 1 January 2005
- Replaced: TechTV
- Former names: Crime & Investigation Network (2005-2014); Crime + Investigation (2014-2024)

Availability

Streaming media
- Foxtel Go: Channel 613
- Binge: binge.com.au

Crime + Investigation logo used from 2017-2024

Real Crime, formerly known as Crime + Investigation (often shortened to CI) is an Australian pay television channel which focuses on crime, investigation and mystery programming. It is run by Foxtel Management Pty Ltd.

The channel was launched on 1 January 2005 as Crime & Investigation Network, replacing the Australian feed of TechTV; it was the first version of C+I worldwide, with the American flagship channel launching three months later. From that date, until 31 July 2024, the programming and name of Crime + Investigation were licensed to Foxtel by A&E Television Networks. On 2 September 2007, the channel became available in New Zealand on Sky, channel 71.

On 5 March 2014, the channel was refreshed and had its name changed to Crime + Investigation. On 25 January 2017 another refresh occurred which dropped the CI initials and the channel was made available in HD.

On 1 August 2024, the channel rebranded to Real Crime.

The channel shows a variety of shows dealing with criminal investigations. The content is mostly sourced from overseas except for limited original content such as the popular Crime Investigation Australia hosted by Steve Liebmann focusing on infamous Australian crimes.

== Programming ==
- Accident Investigator
- Child Snatchers
- Cold Case Files
- COPS
- Crime Investigation Australia
- Crimes That Shook Australia
- Forensic Files
- Gangland
- Homicide Hunter
- Kings Cross ER: St Vincent's Hospital
- Masterminds
- Paradise Lost
- Road Wars
- Rookies
- Street Patrol
- S.W.A.T.
- Snapped
- Tough Nuts: Australia's Hardest Criminals
- The Art of the Heist
- The New Detectives
- Trace Evidence
- Bounty Girls

== See also ==
- Crime & Investigation Network (UK)
- Crime & Investigation Network
