= Bounty Girls: Miami =

- Directed by: Jay Bluemke, Mark Marinaccio
- Country of origin: United States
- Original language: English
- No. of seasons: 1
- No. of episodes: 9

Production
- Executive producers: Craig Piligian, Alan David

Original release
- Network: Court TV
- Release: 2007

Bounty Girls: Miami was a Court TV show that features licensed female bail bond agents that track down and apprehend local fugitives. The women work for Sunshine State Bail Bonds. The show aired on the former Court TV in 2007, with only 9 episodes. After its Court TV run, these episodes were aired on Investigation Discovery in the United States, and on the Crime & Investigation Network in Australia and New Zealand.
