= Forby Sutherland =

British sailor

Forby Sutherland was a member of the crew of the Endeavour during Lieutenant (later Captain) James Cook's voyage to New South Wales. He died while the ship was in Botany Bay, making him the first British subject to die in Australia and the first European to die in New South Wales.

== Life and death in Australia ==
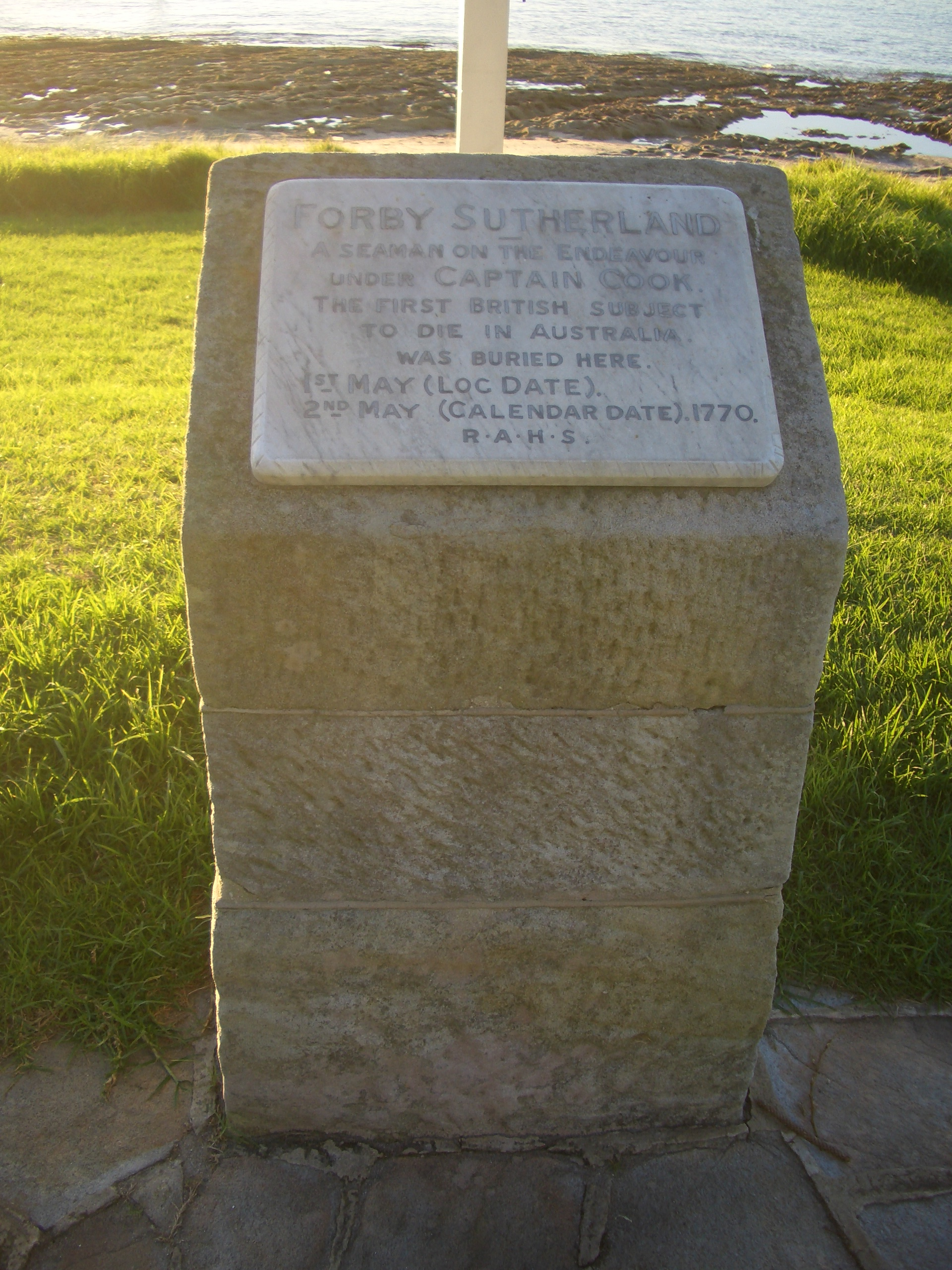
Memorial Stone to Forby Sutherland

Sutherland was an able seaman and also the ship's poulterer (which meant he prepared game birds for the table, including for instance those shot by Joseph Banks and Lieutenant John Gore).

Cook logged that Forby Sutherland died of consumption on the evening of 30 April 1770 while the ship was anchored in the Bay, and was buried ashore at Kurnell the following morning. He had been afflicted by that condition ever since leaving the Le Maire Strait. The actual date of burial was 2 May.

== Memorial ==
Near the landing place, in Kurnell there is a memorial stone, noting that Forby Sutherland was the first British subject to die on Australian soil. The memorial was unveiled on 29 April 1933.

Henry Kendall wrote a poem called "Sutherland's Grave", in remembrance of Forby Sutherland and his burial in Australia.

Some attribute the name of the Sutherland area as his legacy. Forby Sutherland Memorial Park (34.030°S 151.060°E) is in the suburb of Sutherland.

== Sutherland Point ==
Sutherland Point (34.002°S 151.222°E) is the headland at the eastern end of Kurnell beach inside Botany Bay, Australia.

The point was named Point Sutherland by Captain Cook, for crewman Forby Sutherland.
