= Boat Harbour (Kurnell) =

Beach in New South Wales, Australia

- Beach
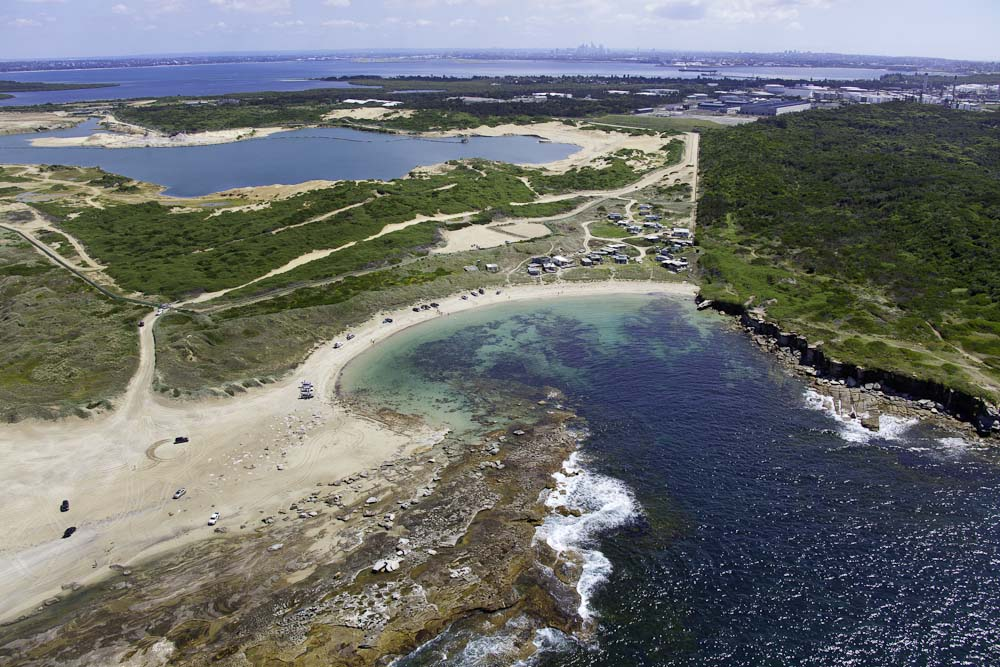
- Aerial view of Boat Harbour Beach, looking north
- Interactive map of Boat Harbour
- Coordinates: 34°02′16″S 151°12′03″E
- Location: Kurnell, Sydney, New South Wales, Australia

Dimensions
  - Length: 150 m (490 ft)
- Hazard rating: 3/10 (least hazardous)
- Access: Captain Cook Drive (road)

Boat Harbour is a small beach located on the southern side of the Botany Bay National Park in Kurnell, Sydney, New South Wales, Australia.

== History ==
The original inhabitants of the land were the Gweagal Aborigines who were a clan of the Tharawal (or Dharawal) tribe of Indigenous Australians. They are the traditional custodians of the southern geographic areas of Sydney.

The first land grant was issued in 1815. 700 acres (2.8 km^{2}) of land on the Kurnell Peninsula which also included Boat Harbour was issued to James Birnie, a whaler and merchant. He named his land ‘Alpha Farm’ and built himself a cottage. When James Birnie was declared insane in 1828, John Connell gained possession of his property. John Connell died in 1848 leaving his estate to his grandsons.

In 1861, the property was sold to Thomas Holt who purchased the land for £3275. Holt, originally from Yorkshire, sailed into Sydney sometime in 1842. He made his fortune during the gold rushes of the early 1850s. Holt moved to Sutherland, and further increased the size of his property holdings to approximately 13,000 acres (53 km^{2}). He erected several mansions and ran his ‘Sutherland Estate’ in the English manner.

The rock platform and reef on the southern side of Boat Harbour is known as 'The Merries'. The coastline in the area is generally east-west, making it a potential hazard for northbound shipping, especially prior to the building of the Cape Baily Light. In 1895, the Aberdeen White Star Line passenger steamer Ninevah, on its way from London to Sydney, ran aground on this reef, during a fog. About a third of the ship's length was on the reef but she was refloated, without assistance, on the rising tide. In 1898, the Moruya Steamship Company's small coastal steamer, Koonya, ran onto the rocks here at night during heavy rain and broke up. In 1905, the Bellambi Coal Company's collier Marjorie ran aground at night and was stranded on this reef, until part of her cargo was jettisoned and she was relocated. There were no deaths in these incidents.

== Fishing ==
In late 2001, Boat Harbour became an aquatic reserve. The new reserve will place restrictions on fishing and bait collection.

== Wildlife ==
The area contains several habitats which include platforms, crevices, rock-pools, boulders and cobbles. Some of the wildlife includes a variety of birds, such as plovers, ruddy turnstone and red-necked stint. From January to late March 2009, an American golden plover was present with a flock of Pacific golden plovers. This species is very rarely recorded in Australia.

== Housing ==
There is no permanent housing located on or near the beach, though the site houses many temporary shacks made from corrugated iron or shipping containers.

== Facilities ==
Boat harbour used to be the location of a 4WD park where driving on beach and sand dunes was permitted. From May 2010 access to the dunes was closed, but beach access remains.

== Recreational Activities ==
Boat harbour is home of one of the best kitesurfing and windsurfing spots in the Sydney Region. It works well in South Easterly or Southerly winds. Boats and PWCs are allowed to the high water mark. Despite efforts to warn off boaters and PWC owners by Holt family rangers, the Holt family only has authority to the high water mark and attempts by them to ban boating are unlawful.
