= Arthur Freeman (cricketer) =

English cricketer

Personal information
- Full name: Arthur Ernest Boden Freeman
- Born: 15 October 1871; Iron Acton, Chipping Sodbury, Gloucestershire, England
- Died: 30 November 1948 (aged 77); Bath, Somerset, England
- Bowling: (unknown hand) Fast

Domestic team information
- Years: Team
- 1905: Somerset

Career statistics
Competition	FC
Matches	1
Runs scored	3
Batting average	3.00
100s/50s	0/0
Top score	3
Catches/stumpings	0/–
- Source: CricketArchive (subscription required), 22 December 2015

Arthur Freeman (15 October 1871 – 30 November 1948) was an English cricketer. He was a fast bowler who played for Somerset. He was born in Iron Acton and died in Bath.

Freeman made one first-class appearance, against Sussex during the 1905 season. Batting in the tailend, Freeman scored 3 runs in the only innings in which he batted.
