= John Leslie Coombes =

Australian serial killer sentenced to life in prison

- Born: John Leslie Coombes; 14 September 1954 (age 72); Victoria, Australia
- Penalty: Life imprisonment without possible parole

Details
- Victims: 3
- Span of crimes: 1984–2009
- Country: Australia
- State: Victoria
- Date apprehended: 2 November 2009

John Leslie Coombes (born 14 September 1954) is a convicted serial killer from Victoria, Australia. He killed twice in 1984 and again in 2009, and is now serving a life sentence with no chance of parole.

== Murder of Henry Desmond Kells, 1984 ==
In 1984 he stabbed and killed Henry Desmond Kells, aged 44, at his home in Chelsea. In December 1985 Coombes was sentenced to life imprisonment, but this was later reduced to a minimum sentence of 11 years.

== Murder of Michael Peter Speirani, 1984 ==
Seven weeks after his release in 1996 he was remanded for the 1984 murder of Michael Speirani who had gone missing on a fishing trip. His stabbed and mutilated body had been dumped a few kilometres off the coast of Port Phillip Bay. In 1998 Coombes received a 10-year minimum sentence. He was paroled in 2007.

== Murder of Raechel Betts, 2009 ==
Coombes strangled Raechel Betts, 27, a childcare worker in August 2009 at the home of co-defendant Nicole Godfrey on Phillip Island. He cut her body up in a bathtub, and threw the body parts off a pier at Newhaven. Coombes changed his plea to guilty during pre-trial arguments at the Supreme Court and was jailed for life with no chance of parole. Justice Geoffrey Nettle noted the similarity between his three murders, saying "It evinces a frightening predilection for homicide" and that he believed that given the chance he would kill again.

== See also ==
- List of serial killers by country
