= Murder of Darcey Freeman =

Australian murderer (born 1972)

Arthur Freeman
- Born: Arthur Phillip Freeman; 1972 (age 53–54); Australia
- Spouse: Peta Barnes (divorced)
- Children: 3 (1 deceased; victim)
- Status: guilty
- Criminal charge: One count of murder
- Penalty: Sentenced to life imprisonment with a 32-year minimum

Details
- Victims: 1
- Country: Australia
- State: Victoria
- Killed: 1
- Date apprehended: 29 January 2009

On 29 January 2009, Arthur Phillip Freeman murdered his four-year-old daughter, Darcey Iris Freeman, by throwing her off the side of the West Gate Bridge in Melbourne, Victoria, Australia.

On 11 April 2011, Freeman was sentenced to life in prison for the murder with a minimum non-parole period of 32 years.

== Incident ==
At approximately 9:15 am on 29 January 2009, Freeman, en route to Melbourne from his parents' home at Aireys Inlet, pulled his white Toyota Land Cruiser 4WD into the then-emergency stopping lane on the West Gate Bridge. He got out of the vehicle, removed his daughter from the back seat, took her over to the railing and dropped her 58 metres (190 feet) into the water below. He then drove off.

At 10:30 am, Freeman walked into the Commonwealth Law Courts in Melbourne. He was said to be hysterical, crying and sobbing. Darcey was rescued but died in the Royal Children's Hospital, Melbourne, at 1:35 pm. Freeman was then arrested and charged with murder.

The case soon became high-profile because of its nature and also as it happened during rush hour traffic when there were many witnesses to the incident. These included Darcey's two brothers who witnessed the incident from Freeman's car.

It is thought the incident led to the subsequent decision to place anti-suicide barriers along the whole length of the West Gate Bridge. Soon after the incident temporary barriers were placed alongside the existing railing.

The incident occurred in the midst of a record breaking heatwave in Melbourne.

== Trial ==
Freeman had been in custody proceedings with his ex-wife Peta Barnes. Barnes had recently been granted more time with the children, which angered Freeman. Freeman was alleged to have said to Barnes minutes before the incident, "Say goodbye to your children." Lawyers acting on behalf of Freeman had claimed Freeman's actions were due to mental illness; however, this was dispelled by the custody battle revelation.

On 28 March 2011, the jury found Freeman guilty of the murder of his daughter. On 11 April 2011 Freeman was sentenced to life in prison with a minimum non-parole period of 32 years. Justice Paul Coghlan called the killing a "fundamental breach of trust", saying "What Darcey's last thoughts might have been does not bear thinking about, and her death must have been a painful and protracted one". Freeman attempted to appeal this sentence in May 2011 but was unsuccessful.

== Media ==
The murder was featured on TV series Crimes That Shook Australia.
