= Bate Bay =

Bay in New South Wales, Australia

Coordinates: 34.045°S 151.176°E

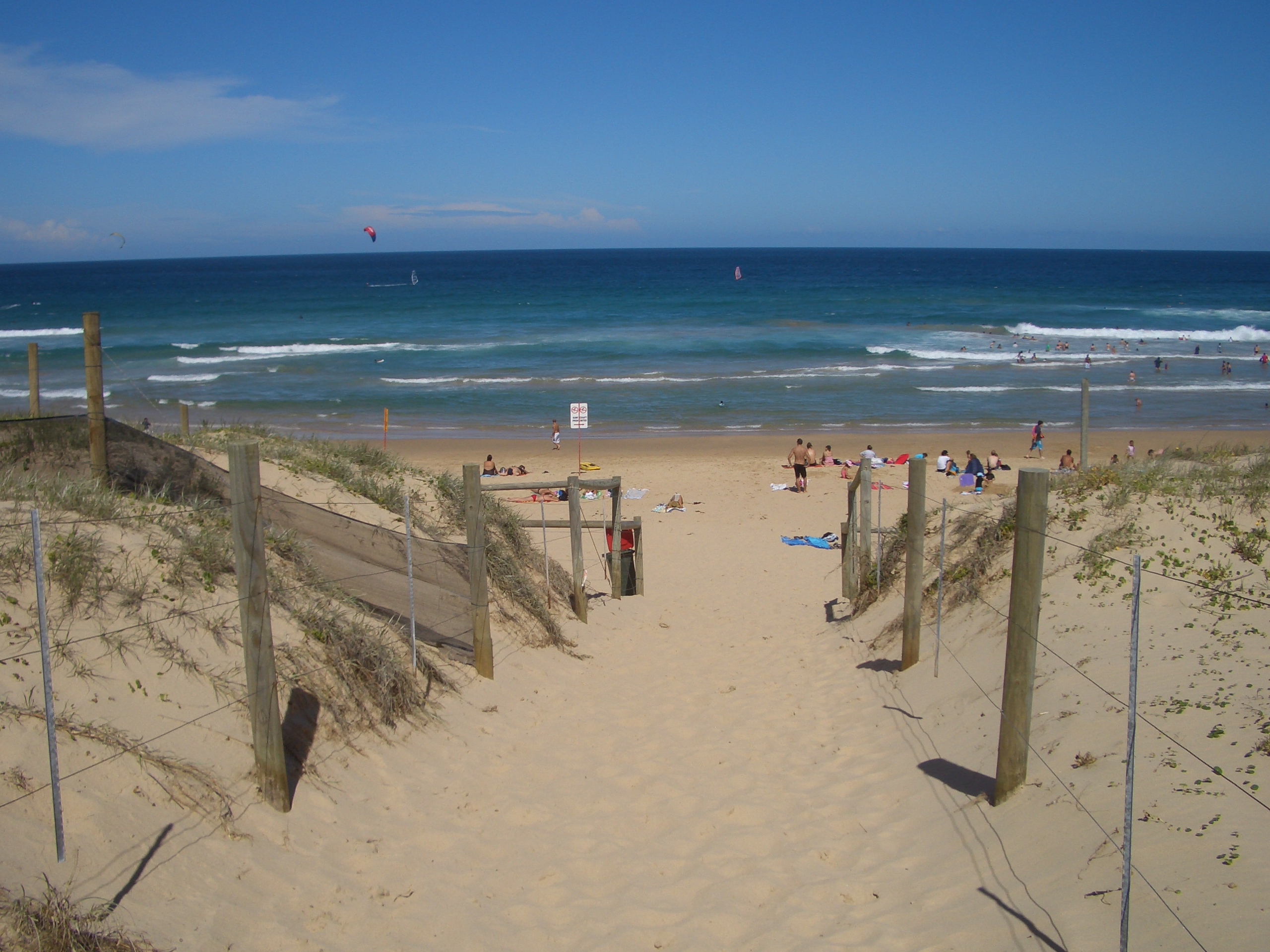
Wanda Beach on Bate Bay

Bate Bay is a bay in Southern Sydney, Australia. The bay is south of the Kurnell peninsula and its foreshore makes up the beaches of Cronulla.

The beaches of Cronulla from north to south are: Wanda Beach, Elouera Beach, North Cronulla Beach, Cronulla Beach, Blackwoods Beach and Shelly Beach. Local names also apply to various parts of the beach, such as The Wall, between North Cronulla and Elouera, Big Man's Knob to the east of Elouera and Green Hills, to the north of Wanda.

In 2026, the Bate Bay beach have been voted as the best beach in Australia.
