= Wanda Beach =

Beach in Cronulla, Sydney, Australia

- Beach
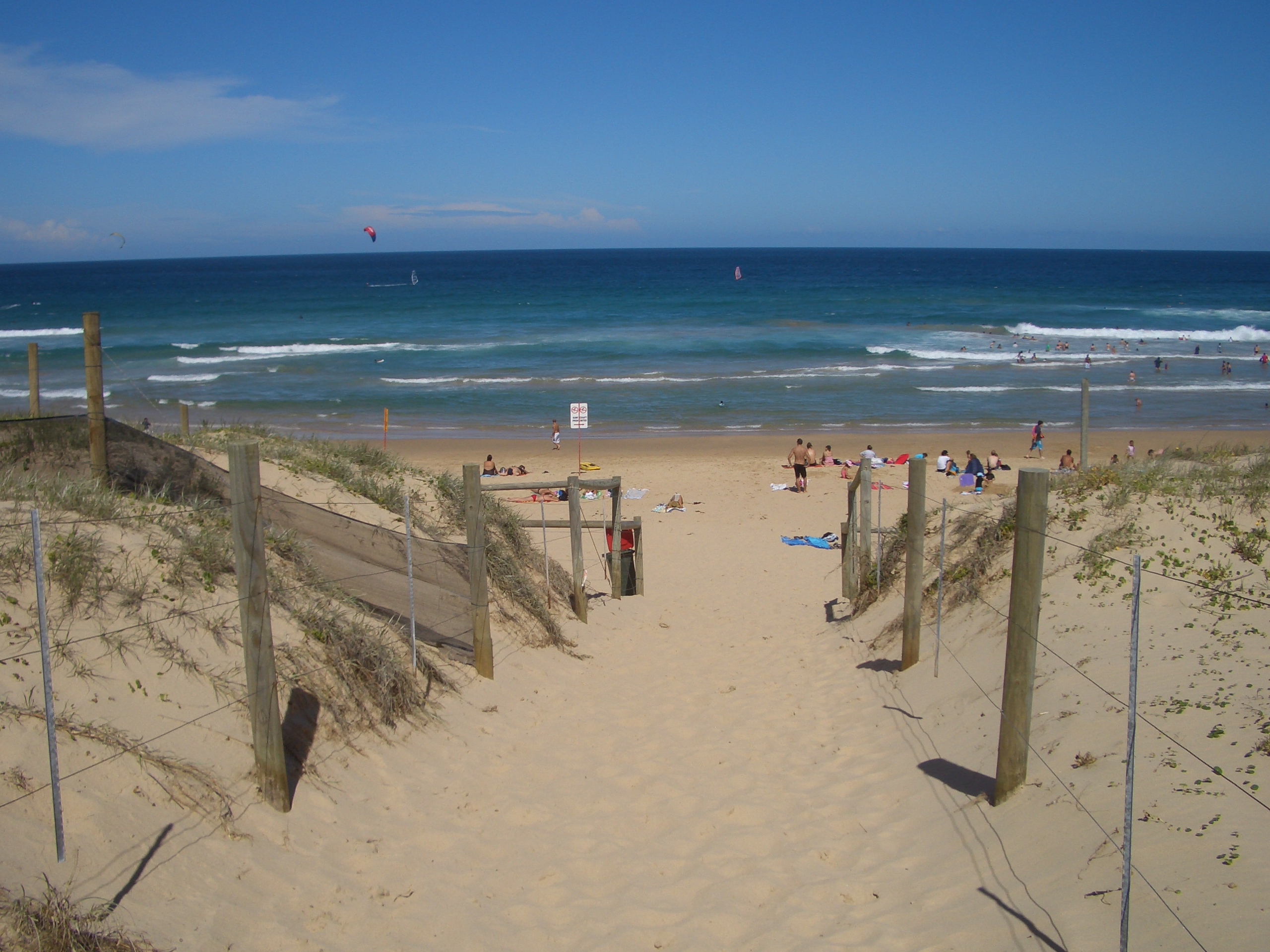
- View of Wanda Beach looking east towards Bate Bay
- Interactive map of Wanda Beach
- Coordinates: 34°02′36″S 151°09′43″E
- Location: Cronulla, Sydney, New South Wales, Australia

Dimensions
  - Length: 1,500 m (4,900 ft)
- Patrolled by: Wanda Surf Life Saving Club
- Hazard rating: 7/10 (highly hazardous)

Designations

New South Wales Heritage Register
- Official name: Cronulla Sand Dune and Wanda Beach Coastal Landscape
- Type: Landscape – Natural
- Criteria: a, b, c, d, e, f, g
- Designated: 26 September 2003
- Reference no.: 01668

Wanda Beach or Wanda is the northernmost patrolled beach at Bate Bay in Cronulla, Sydney, New South Wales, Australia. Greenhills is the name given to the Cronulla sand dunes, and unofficial suburb just north of Wanda.

== History ==
The original inhabitants of the land were the Aboriginal Gweagal Clan who were a clan of the Tharawal (or Dharawal) tribe of Indigenous Australians. They are the traditional custodians of the southern geographic areas of Sydney. Wanda is an Aboriginal word for beach or sand hills.

The Wanda Surf Lifesaving Club was established in 1946 after World War II by a group of men who banded together, as they did in warfare, to patrol the beaches. The colours of Army red, Air Force blue, and Navy blue were adopted as the club colours. The club, located on Marine Esplanade, has grown in size to its current membership of over 900 male and female members, ranging in age from five-year-old Nippers to the original Founding Members. The primary objective of the club is to patrol the beach in an effort to ensure the safety of the surfing public but it is also actively involved in the competition arena, with excellent performances at State and National Competitions. A number of social activities and carnivals are organised throughout the year to bring together members from all sections of the club, like training sessions and Sunday nippers.

In 1965 the beach became notorious after the Wanda Beach Murders.

== Gallery ==
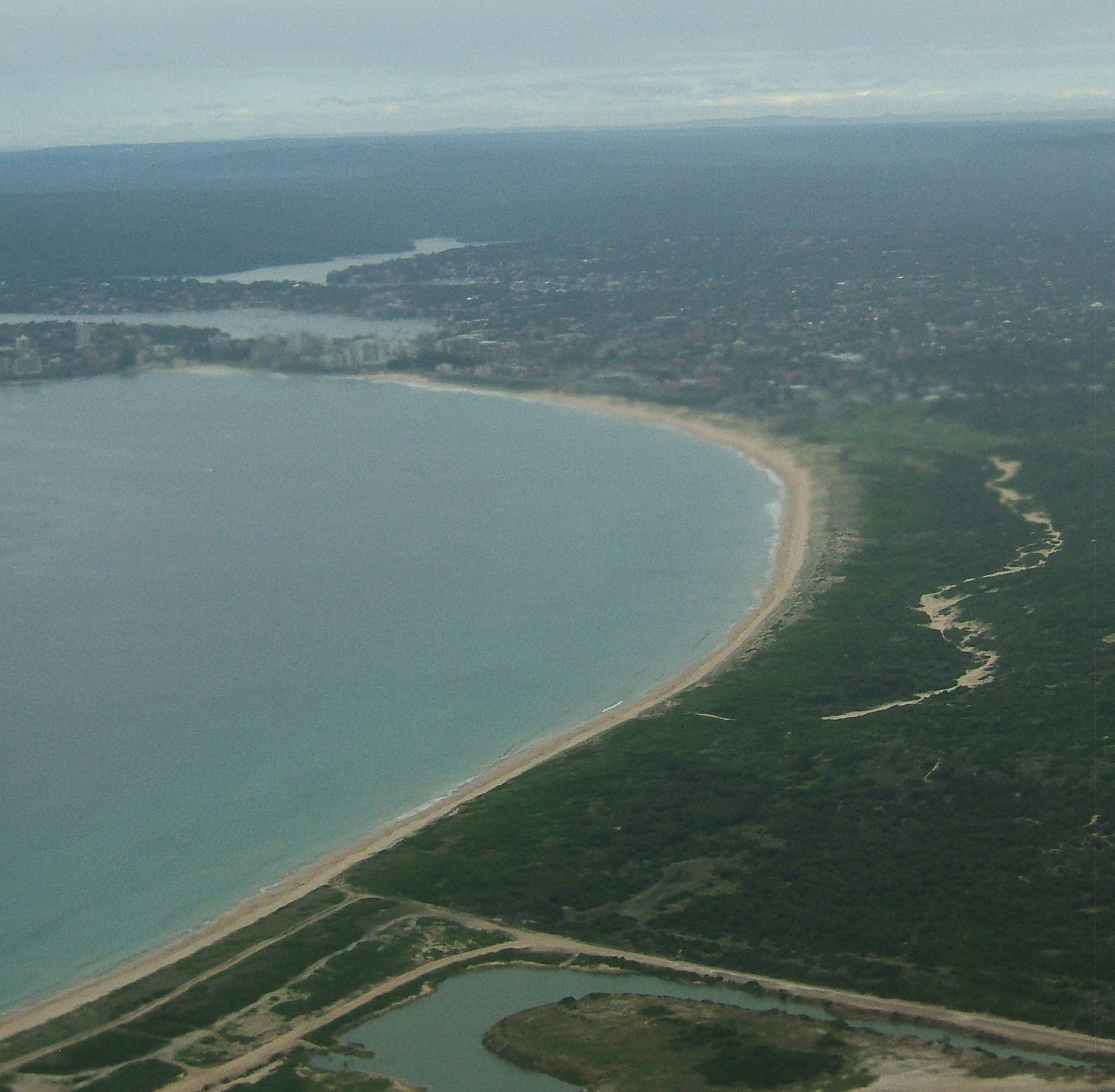
Aerial view

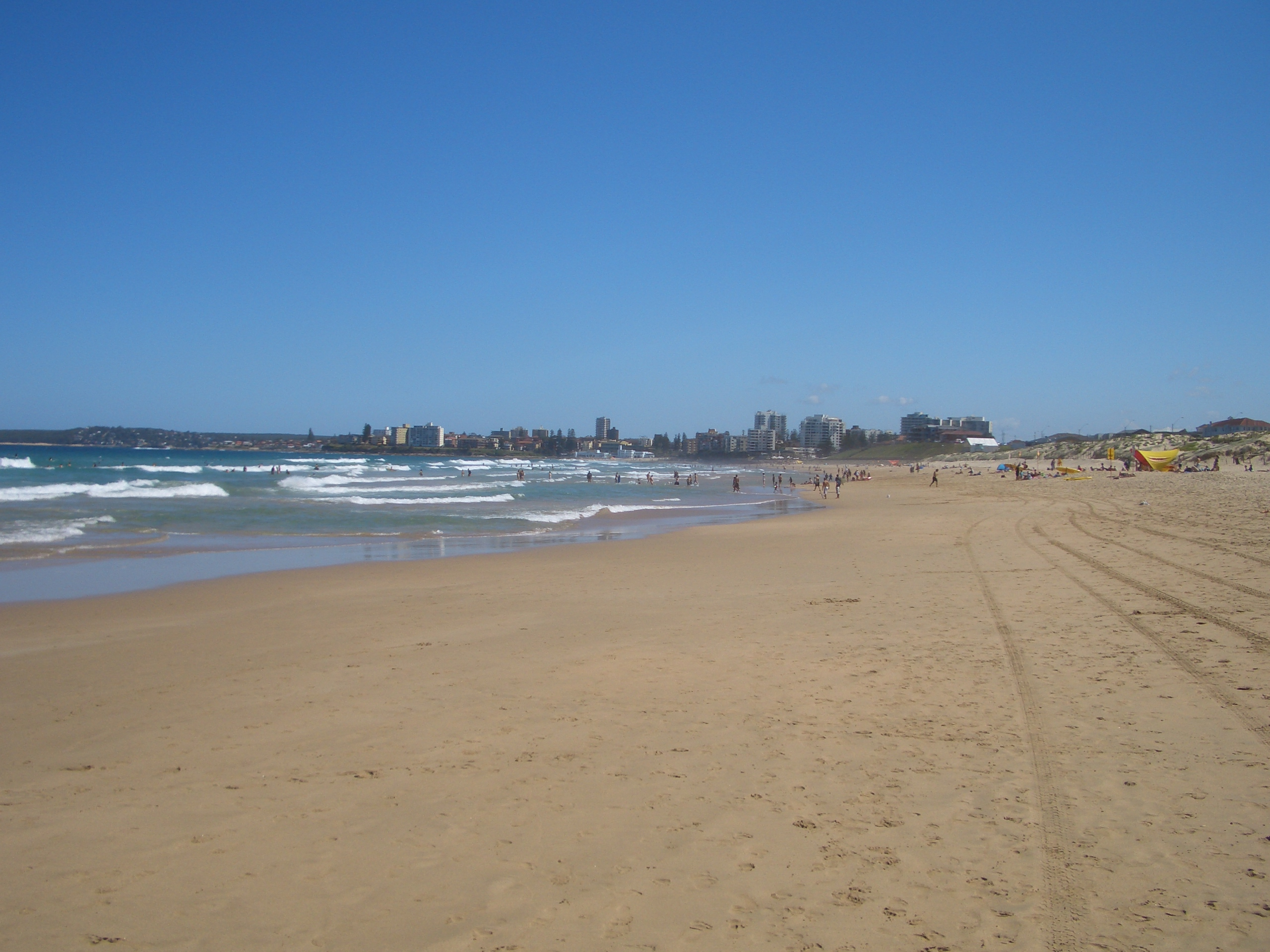
Wanda Beach

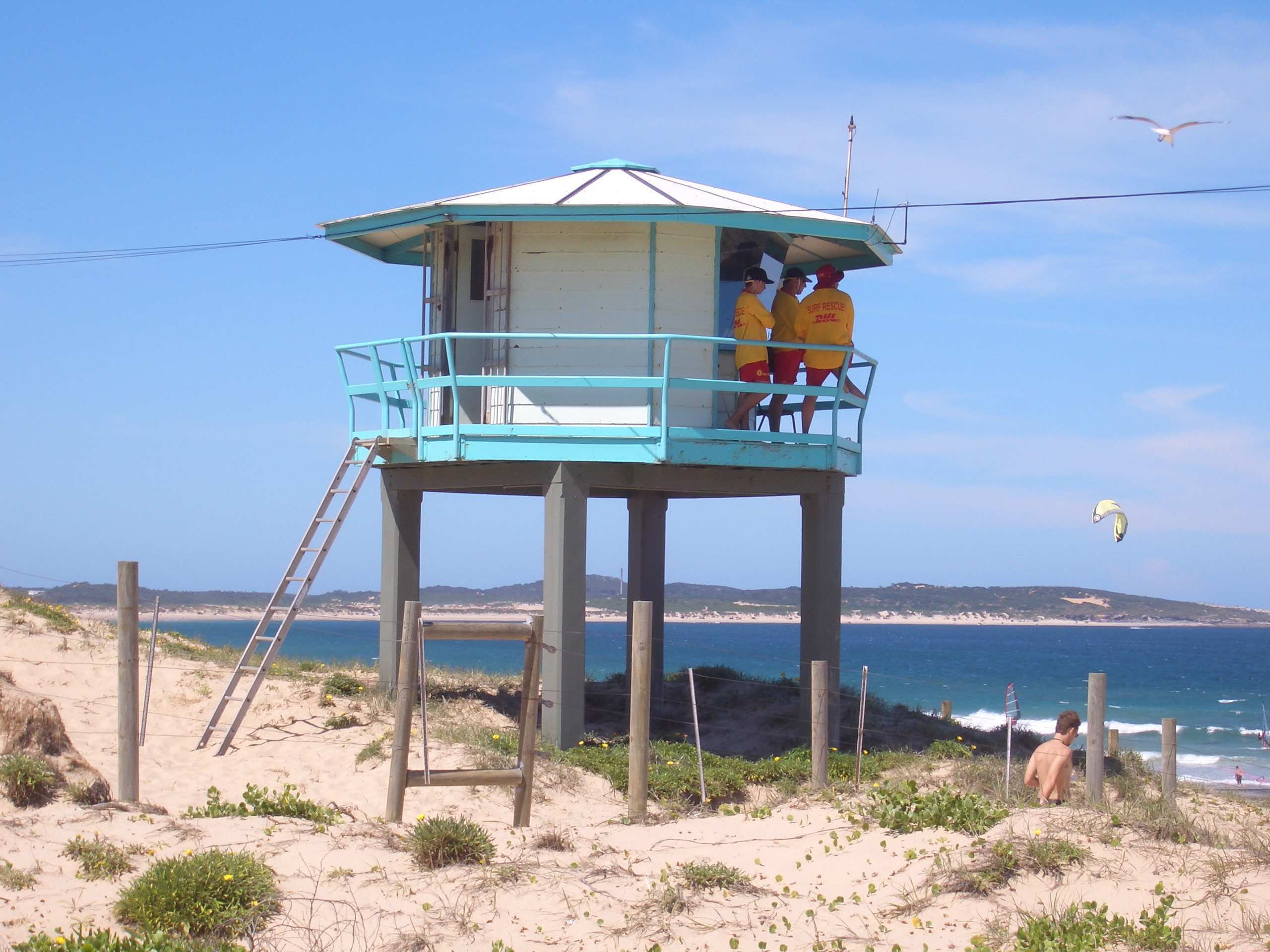
Wanda Beach Tower

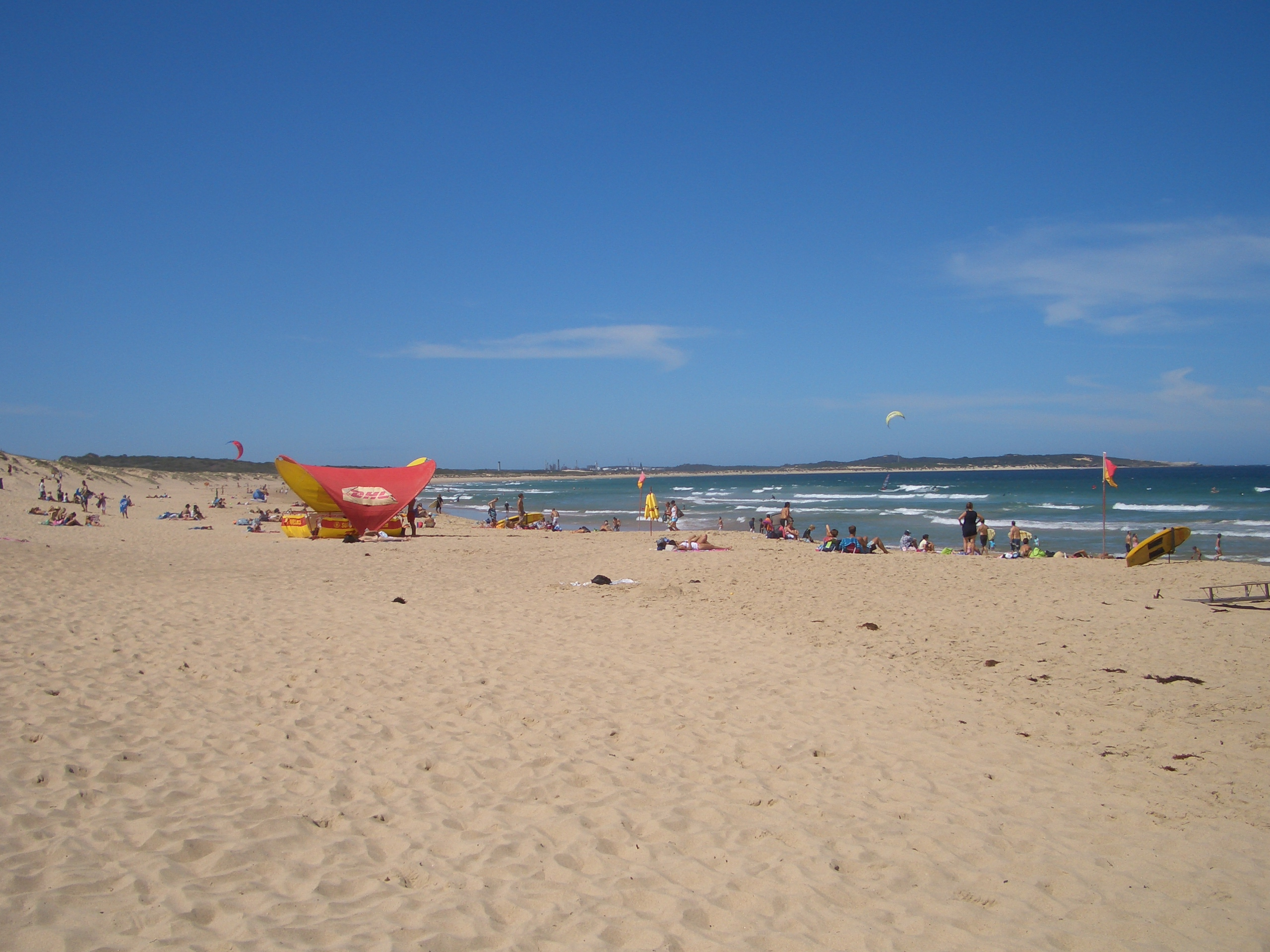
Wanda Beach

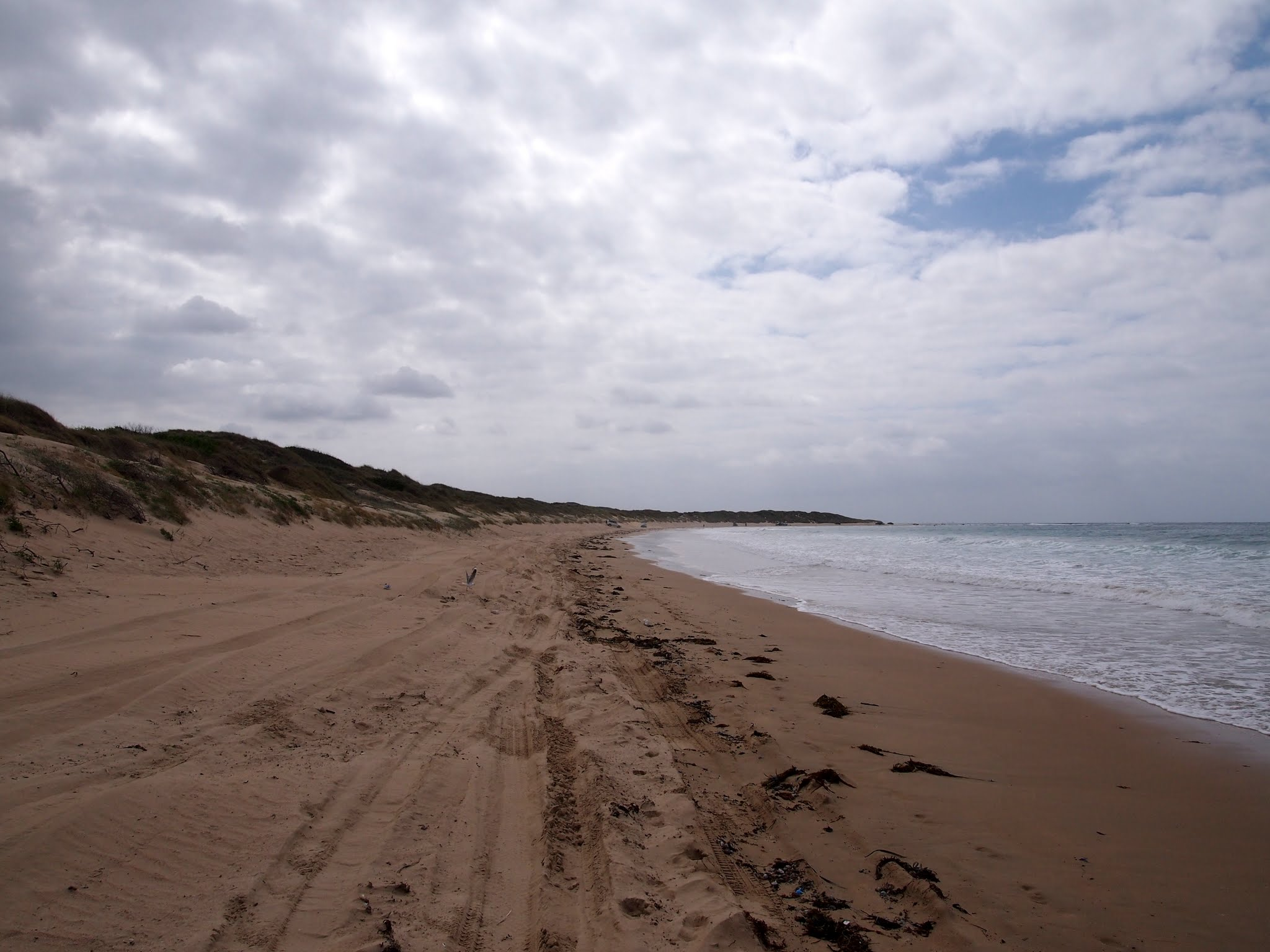
Wanda Beach
