= Cape Baily Light =

Lighthouse in New South Wales, Australia

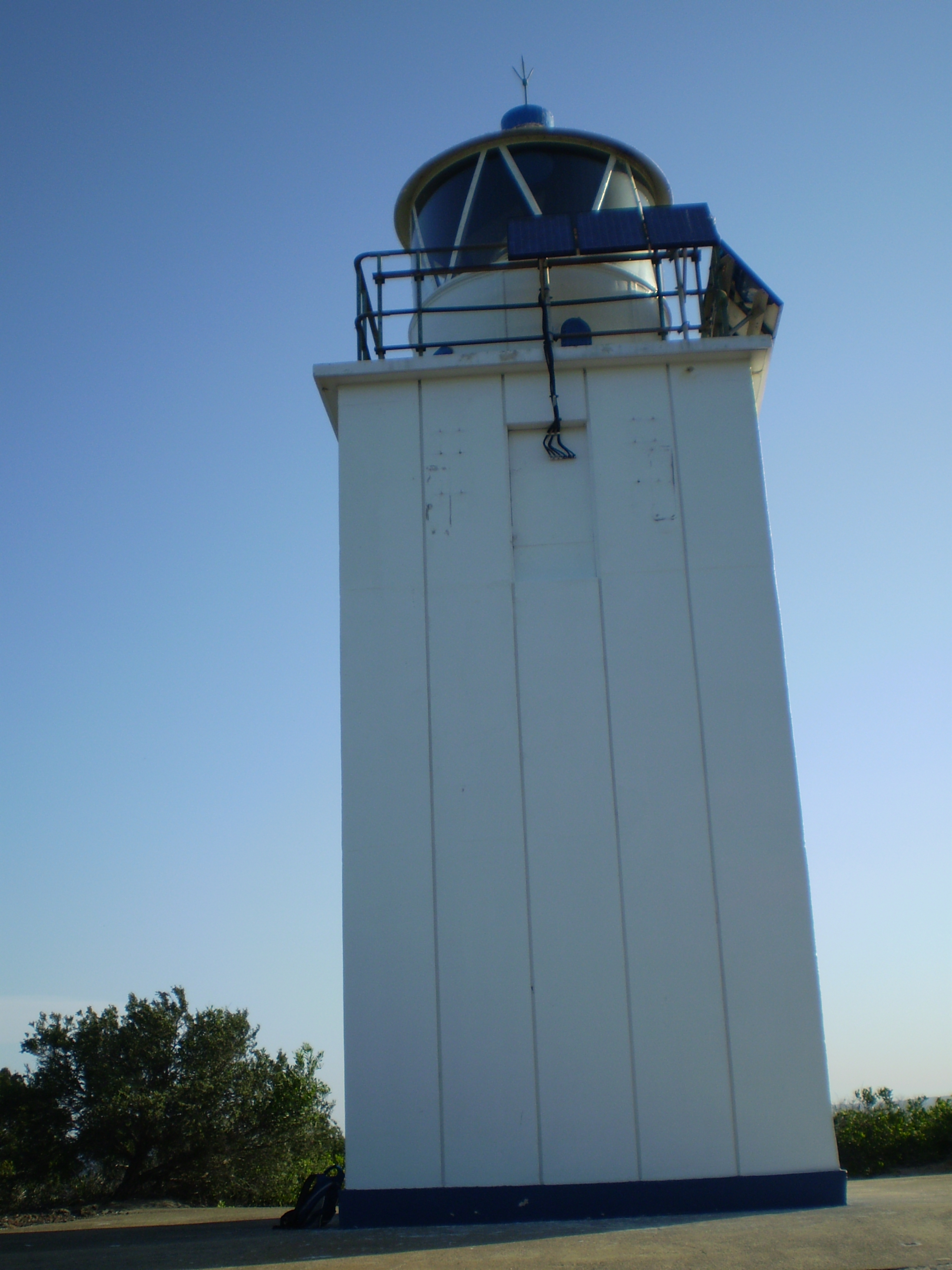
- Cape Baily Light, 2007
- Location: Kurnell; New South Wales; Australia
- Coordinates: 34°2′6.56″S 151°13′20.05″E

Tower
- Constructed: 1950
- Construction: concrete tower
- Height: 9.1 metres (30 ft)
- Shape: square tower with balcony and lantern
- Markings: white tower and lantern
- Power source: solar power
- Operator: National Parks and Wildlife Service (New South Wales)
- Heritage: listed on the Commonwealth Heritage List

Light
- Focal height: 54.9 metres (180 ft)
- Intensity: 1,200 candela
- Range: 13 nautical miles (24 km)
- Characteristic: Fl (4) W 16s.

Cape Baily Light is an active lighthouse located at Cape Baily, a headland at the south side of the entrance to Botany Bay, New South Wales, Australia. The light serves to help north-bound shipping hug the coast to avoid the strong southerly currents further out to sea.

== History ==
The light was first considered in 1931 but only constructed in 1950. Its lantern enclosure was taken from an unknown late-19th-century lighthouse. It is currently solar powered.

== Site operation ==
The light is operated by the Australian Maritime Safety Authority, while the site is managed by Department of Environment, Climate Change and Water as part of the Botany Bay National Park.

== Visiting ==
The site is open, and accessible by a hike of about 2.5 hours round trip from the end of Solander Road in Kurnell, but the tower is closed.

== See also ==
- List of lighthouses in Australia
