= Silver Beach (New South Wales) =

Beach in Sydney

- Beach
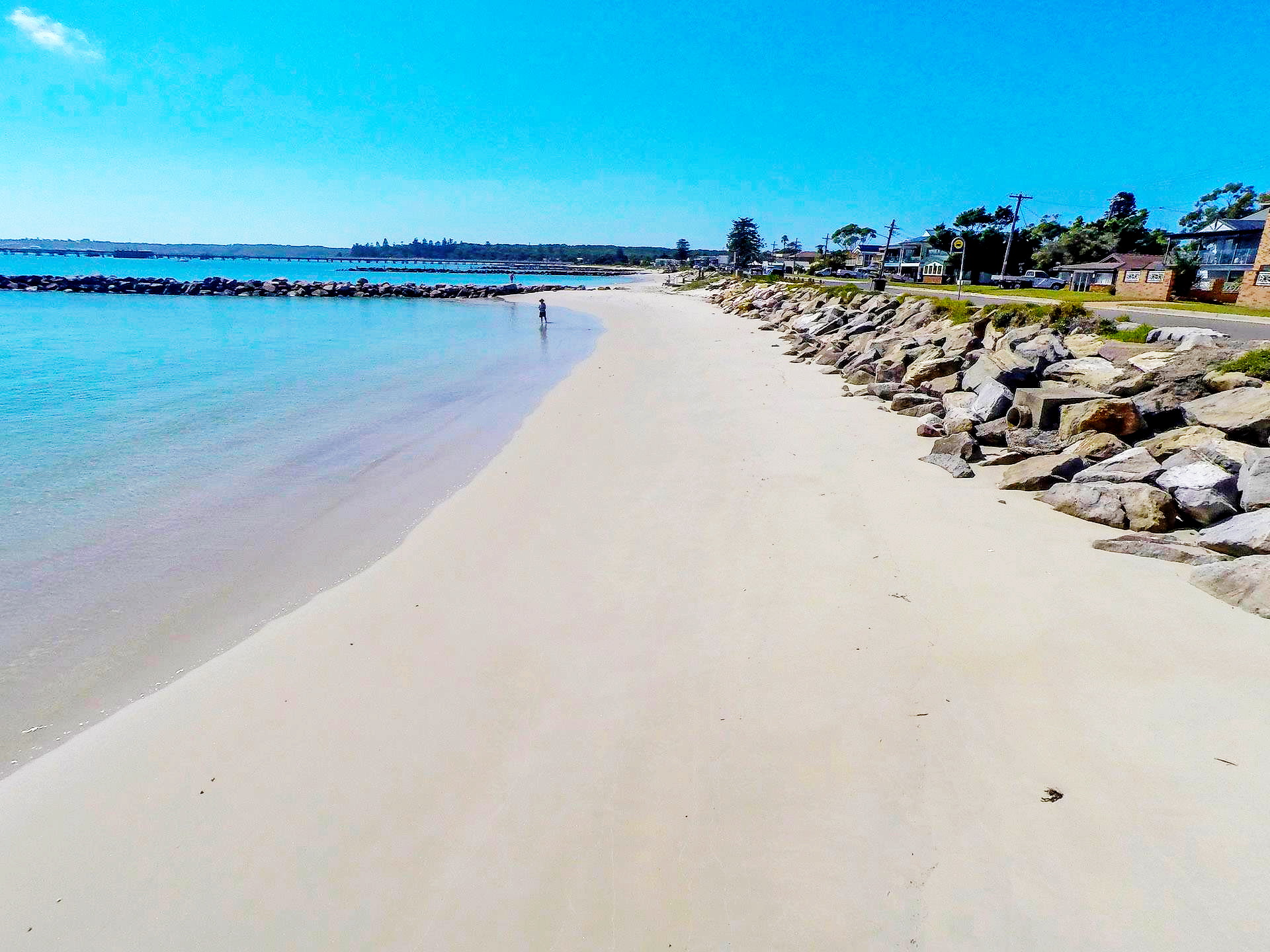
- Interactive map of Silver Beach
- Coordinates: 34°00′28″S 151°12′43″E
- Location: Kurnell in Sydney, New South Wales, Australia
- Offshore water bodies: Botany Bay

Dimensions
  - Length: 2.8 kilometres (1.7 mi)
- Hazard rating: 1/10 (least hazardous)
- Access: Prince Charles Parade

Silver Beach is a 2.8 km (1.7 mi) long west-trending sand spit in Kurnell, Sydney, New South Wales, Australia that is located 18 km (11 mi) south of the Sydney CBD. Situated on the northwestern reaches of the Kurnell Peninsula and linked with the sandstone of Sutherland Point in the east, the beach is characterised by silver-coloured sands, hence the name, and fourteen rockwall groynes which project into Botany Bay.

The eastern point of the beach is the site where Captain James Cook first set foot on Australian soil in 1770, which marked the beginning of Britain's interest in Australia and in the eventual colonisation of this new "southern continent".

== History ==
The people moving through and living in the Kurnell area were the northernmost clan of the Dharawal speakers, the Gweagal. On the northern headland the people were most likely Cadigal people of the Darug language group. The people living on the headlands and shores at the entrance to Botany Bay benefited from the many food and other resources and the mild climate of the area.

On both shorelines are many midden sites providing evidence of the rich variety of seafoods enjoyed by the Indigenous people. Many of the local plants were edible such as the roots of the common fern and warrigal, a spinach-like leafy plant that grew along the local fresh water streams on both northern and southern headlands. Because of its bountiful resources, the north and south headlands of Botany Bay were important ceremonial gathering places for the Dharawal on the south of Botany Bay and the Darug on the northern shores.

=== British settlement ===
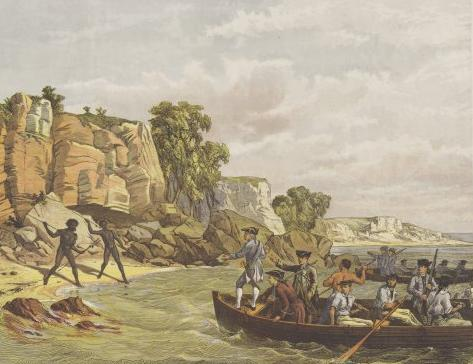
Cook and crew approaching the beach

On 29 April 1770, whilst navigating his way up the east coast of Australia on Endeavour, Captain James Cook and crew made their first landing on the continent, on this beach, and made contact of a hostile nature with the Gweagal Aborigines. Royal Navy officer Isaac Smith became the first European to set foot on eastern Australian soil, with Cook telling him "Jump out, Isaac" as the ship's boat touched the shore at the beach.

In traditional Aboriginal culture it is customary for visitors to wait to be invited to approach the custodians of that area so when Cook and his men landed, the local people attempted to discourage the strangers from entering land: two warriors painted in ceremonial ochre threatened the British with spears to which Cook ordered either one or two muskets fired. As Cook and his party landed, a spear was thrown by one of the warriors before they retreated and commenced to ignore the intruders for the entire time the British were anchored in the bay.

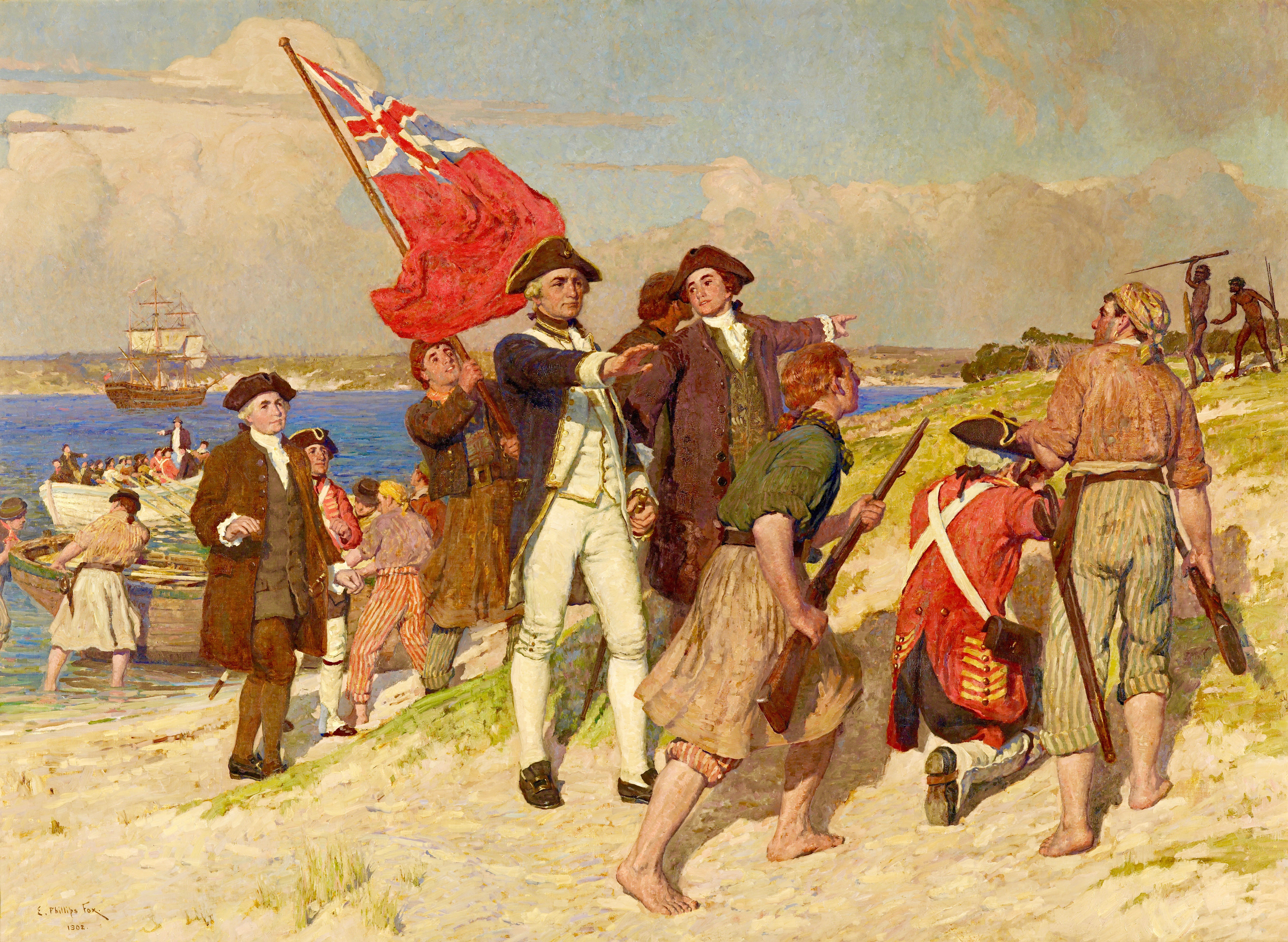
Cook and crew on the shore

This first landing site was backed up (especially by Joseph Banks) as an appropriate prospect for a British colonial outpost, with Cook reporting back to England that the land was suited for agriculture and was thinly wooded. Nonetheless, about 18 years later, when Captain Arthur Phillip and the First Fleet arrived in early 1788 to establish an outpost and penal colony, they found that the Bay and its surrounds did not live up to the promising picture that had been painted, as the area had poor soil, no secure anchorage, no adequate supply of fresh water, and the vegetation was too dense.

From the 1820s, Captain Cook's landing place was a popular destination for people with an interest in European history in Australia. In 1870 NSW treasurer Thomas Holt erected Cook's Obelisk to mark the European arrival at Botany Bay. To cope with the area's increasing visitation Holt built the first wharf at Kurnell just adjacent to the Obelisk and a steam ferry began to operate sometime around 1882. Cook's Obelisk, as well as some other collection sites, was added to the Australian National Heritage List on 10 September 2017.

== Geography ==
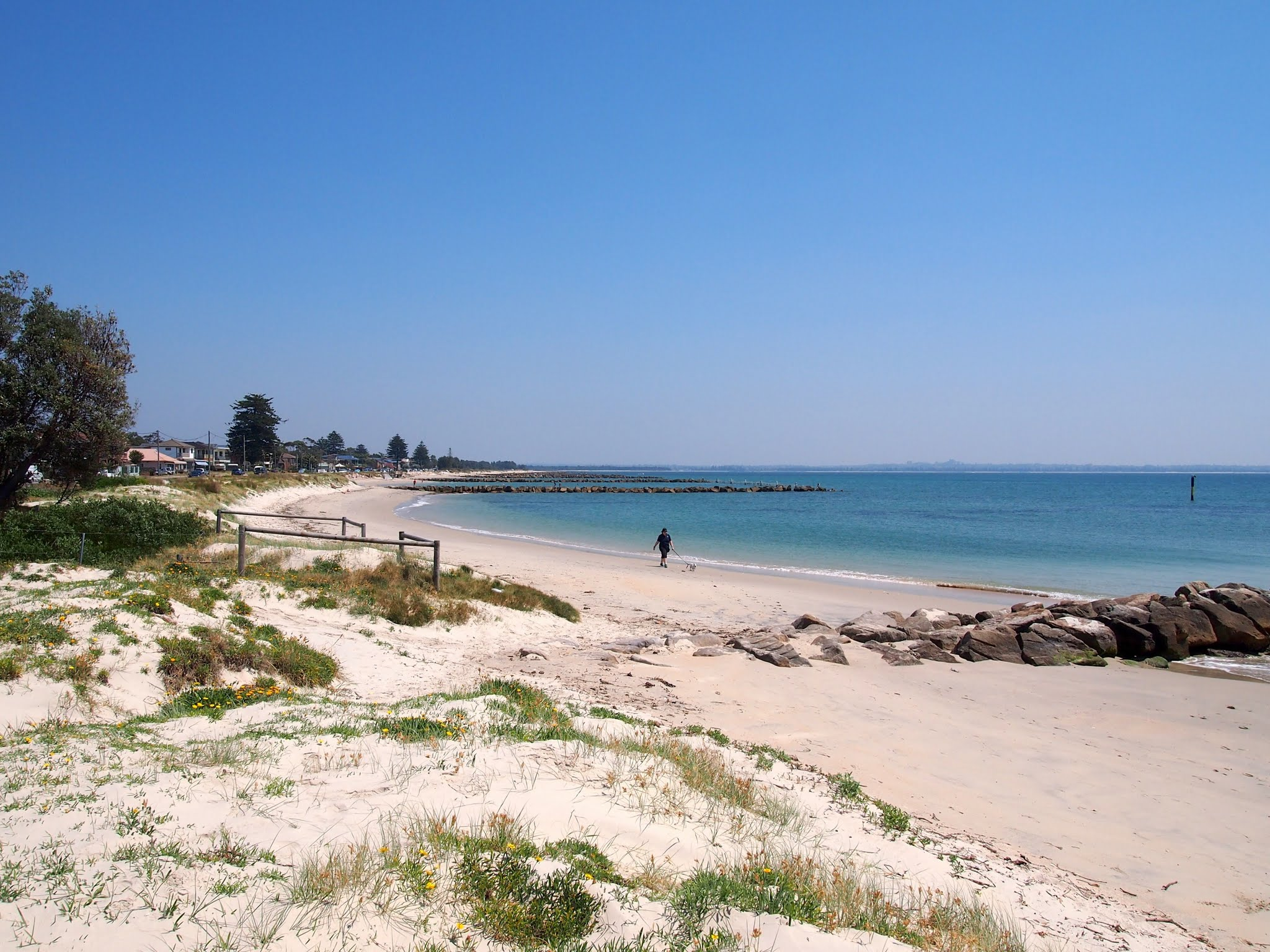
View of Silver Beach

Backed by 2 km (1.2 mi) of beachfront houses and crossed by the 1 km (0.62 mi) jetty for the Kurnell Refinery, the beach is outstretched to the west where it has partly enclosed the mangrove-lined shores of Quibray Bay. Its rock wall groynes were established in 1969–70 in reaction to stark beach erosion which was accumulated on the eastern end. The 100–200 m wide western end of the spit is a 1 km (0.62 mi) long beachfront reserve, fronted by four of the groynes with a boat ramp held against the fourth groyne.

Passing along the posterior of the intertidal rocks, where Cook landed, is a 530 m (1,740 ft) strip of high tide sand that begins at the junction and continues past the Captain Cook Obelisk and the Sutherland memorial (one of Cook's sailors who is buried at the site) to the Solander monument at Sutherland Point. The rocks at the eastern tip of Silver Beach showcase the beginning of the large sandstone Kurnell Peninsula and its 8 km (5.0 mi) of rocky shore located in Botany Bay National Park.

== Recreation ==
Silver Beach is a popular swimming spot in Sydney, with a netted swimming area at the centre of the beach's strip. Fishing is permitted, with bream, trevally and flathead being the most predominant in the bay. There exists modern and historic monuments along the Burrawang Walk, which can be entered from the east end of Silver Beach (just past the pier), a couple of bushland trails through the park, picnic areas, whale watching and Cape Solander Trail that winds all the way to Greenhills Beach. On the western end, there is a dog park, which is also a beach area for dogs.

== Access ==
The beach is situated on the corner of Dampier Street and Prince Charles Parade, on the south coast of Botany Bay and is accessible from Captain Cook Drive via Princes Highway from the west. There is a large carpark at Bonna Point Reserve adjacent to the boat ramp, as well as along the length of Prince Charles Parade. There are bus stops on the Parade.
