= Botany Bay =

Open ocean bay in Sydney, Australia

- Kamay/Gamay, Sting Ray Harbour
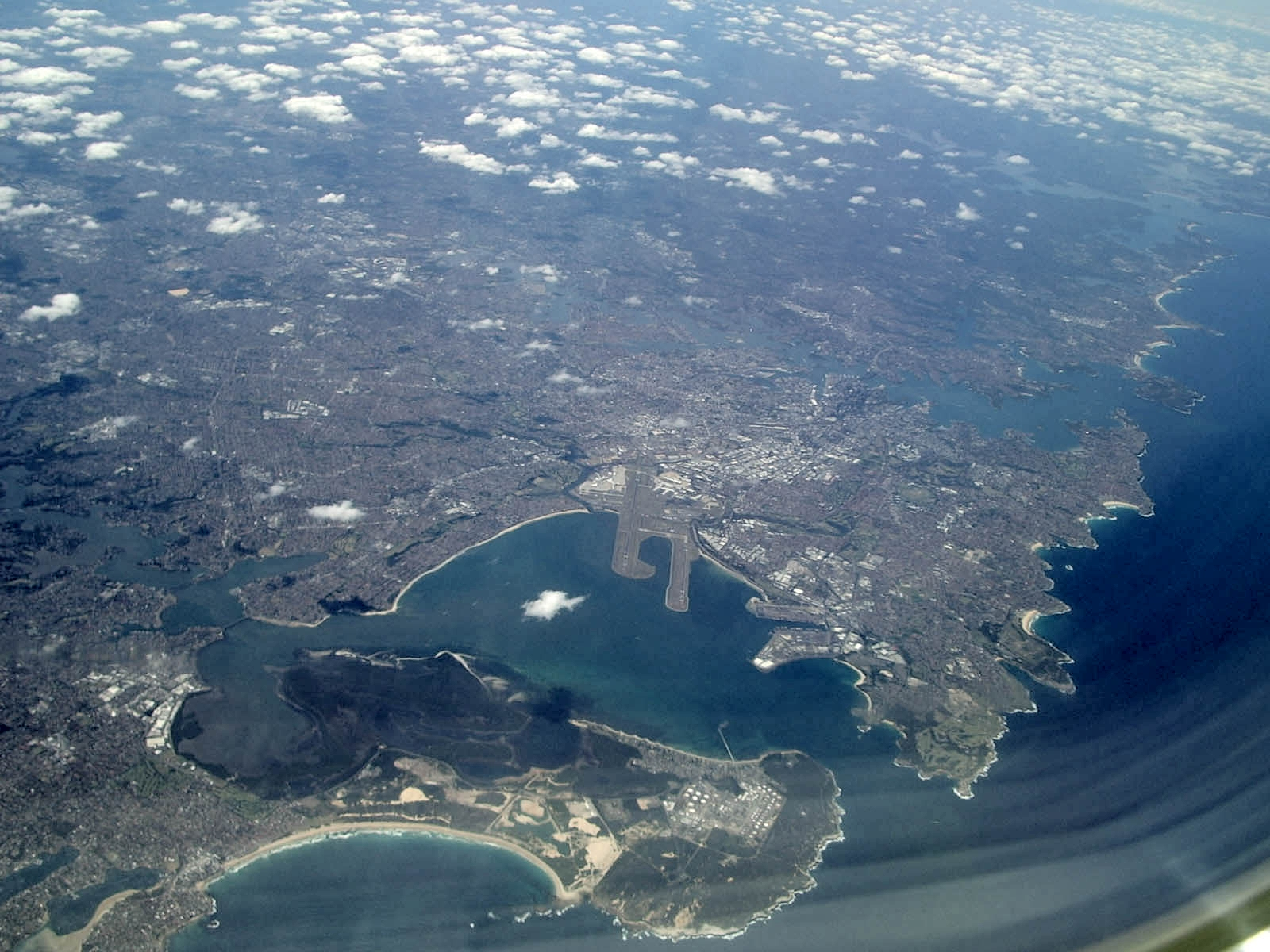
- Aerial photo of Sydney showing Botany Bay in the foreground. The two protrusions into the bay are runways of Sydney Airport.

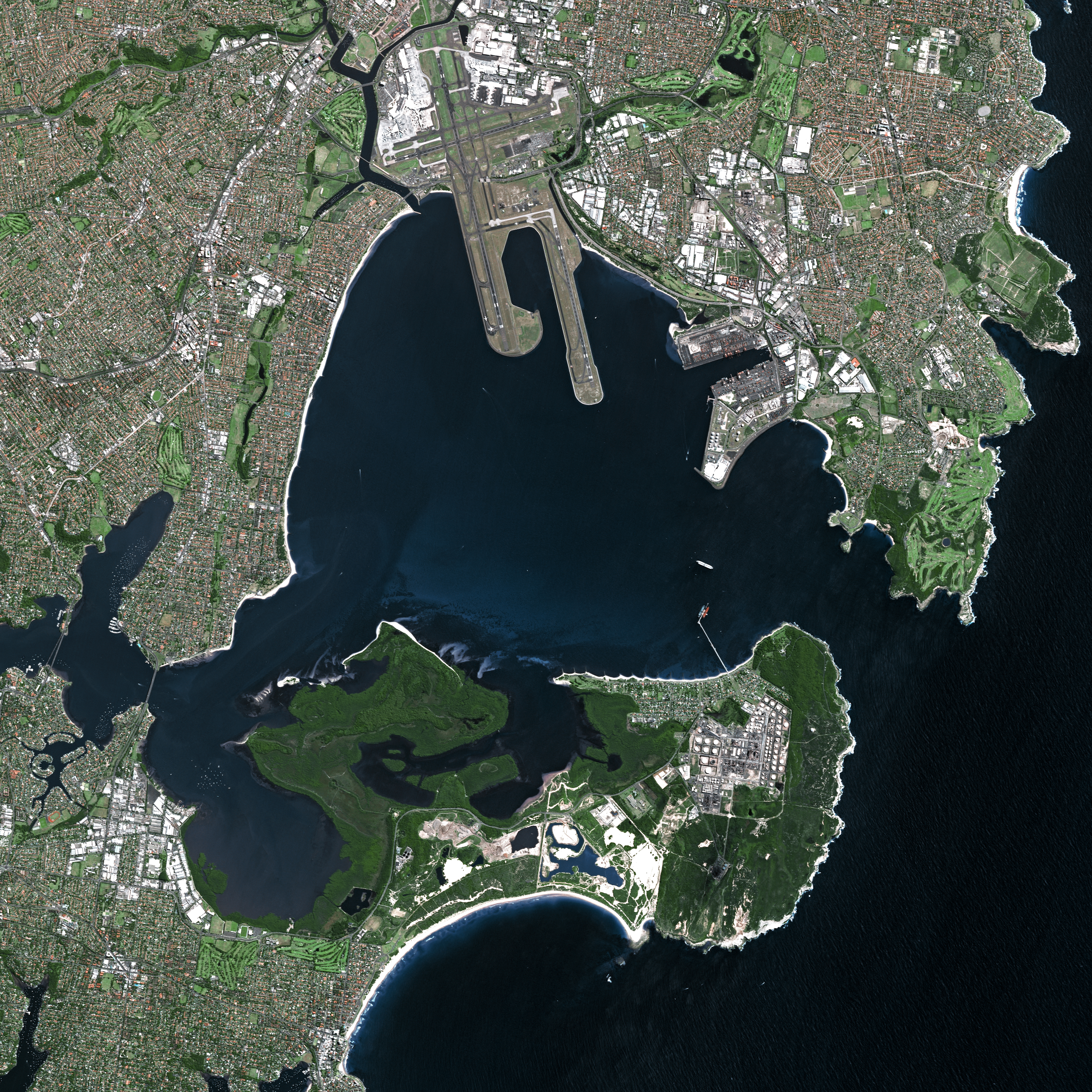

- Location within east Sydney
- Location: Sydney, New South Wales, Australia
- Coordinates: 33°59′59″S 151°13′59″E
- Type: Bay
- Primary inflows: Georges River, Cooks River
- Primary outflows: Tasman Sea
- Catchment area: 54.9 km^{2} (21.2 sq mi)
- Max. length: 10 km (6.2 mi)
- Surface area: 39.6 km^{2} (15.3 sq mi)
- Average depth: 11.4 m (37 ft)
- Water volume: 440,815,800 m^{3} (1.556726×10^{10} cu ft)
- Website: NSW Environment & Heritage webpage

Botany Bay (Dharawal: Kamay) is an open oceanic embayment, located in Sydney, New South Wales, Australia, 13 km (8 mi) south of the Sydney central business district. Its source is the confluence of the Georges River at Taren Point and Sans Souci as well as the Cooks River at Kyeemagh, which flows 10 km (6 mi) to the east before meeting its mouth at the Tasman Sea, midpoint between the suburbs of La Perouse and Kurnell. The northern headland of the entrance to the bay from the Tasman Sea is Cape Banks, and, on the southern side, the outer headland is Cape Solander, and the inner headland is Sutherland Point.

The total catchment area of the bay is approximately 55 km^{2} (21 sq mi). Despite its relative shallowness, the bay now serves as greater metropolitan Sydney's main cargo seaport, located at Port Botany, with facilities managed by Sydney Ports Corporation. Two runways of Sydney Airport extend into the bay, as do some port facilities. Kamay Botany Bay National Park is located on the northern and southern headlands of the bay. The area surrounding the bay is generally managed by Transport for NSW.

The land adjacent to Botany Bay was settled for many millennia by the Tharawal and Eora peoples and their associated clans. On 29 April 1770, Botany Bay was the site of James Cook's first landing of His Majesty's Bark Endeavour on the land mass of Australia, after his extensive navigation of New Zealand. Later, the British planned Botany Bay as the site for a penal colony. Out of these plans came the first European habitation of Australia at Sydney Cove. Although the penal settlement was almost immediately shifted to Sydney Cove, for some time in Britain, transportation to "Botany Bay" was a metonym for transportation to any of the Australian penal colonies.

== History ==
=== Aboriginal history ===
Archaeological evidence from the shores of Botany Bay has revealed an Aboriginal settlement dating back 5,000 years. The Aboriginal people of Sydney were the Eora, the Dharawal, and the Dharug, who comprised at least 28 known clans with traditional boundaries. The clans of the Botany Bay area were the Gweagal who occupied the south shore and the Kamaygal on the north shore. It is possible that the Bidjigal clan lived between the Cooks River and the Georges River, but the evidence for this is unclear.

Botany Bay is named Kamay in the Dharawal language.

=== European history and later ===
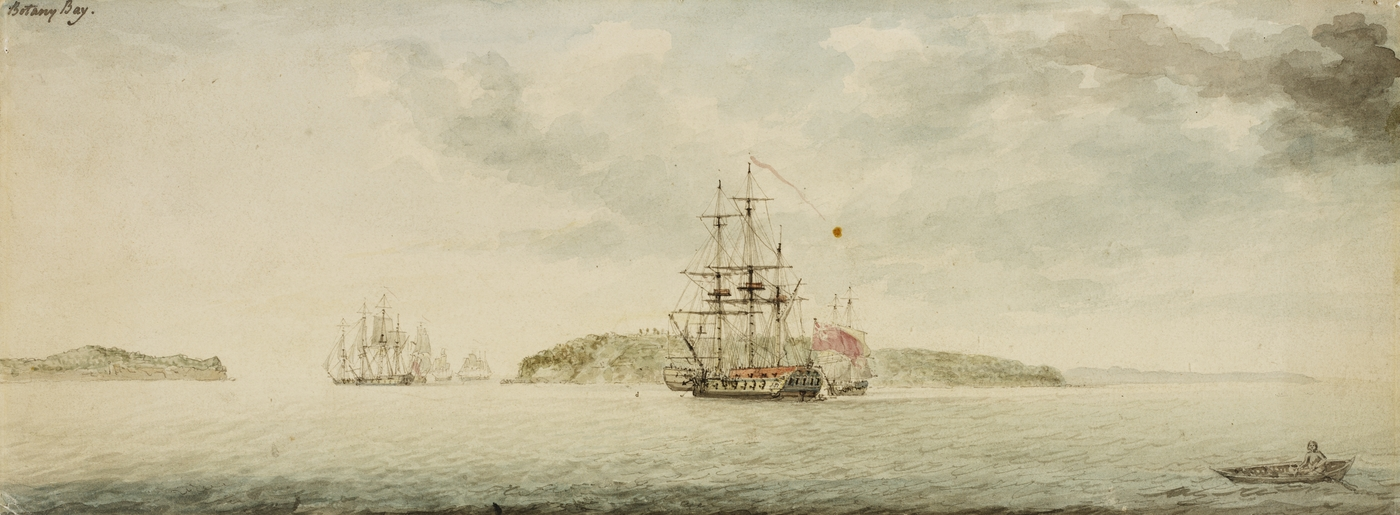
Botany Bay, 1788 watercolour by Charles Gore

Lieutenant James Cook first landed at Kurnell, on the southern banks of Botany Bay, in what is now Silver Beach, on Sunday 29 April 1770, when navigating his way up the east coast of Australia on his ship, HMS Endeavour. Initially the name Stingrays Harbour was used by Cook and other journal keepers on his expedition, for the stingrays they caught. That name was also recorded on an Admiralty chart. Cook's log for 6 May 1770 records "The great quantity of these sort of fish found in this place occasioned my giving it the name of Stingrays Harbour". However, in the journal prepared later from his log, Cook wrote instead: (sic) "The great quantity of plants Mr. Banks and Dr. Solander found in this place occasioned my giving it the name of ~~Botanist~~ Botany Bay". (Note: The strikethrough is in the Cook's original, reflecting a change of mind sometime after leaving the Bay in 1770.) Cape Banks is named after Joseph Banks and Cape Solander after Daniel Solander.

18 years later, Governor Arthur Phillip sailed the armed tender HMS Supply into the bay on 18 January 1788. First contact was made with the local Indigenous people, the Eora, who seemed curious but suspicious of the newcomers. Two days later, the remaining ships of the First Fleet arrived to found the planned penal colony. The land was quickly ruled unsuitable for settlement as there was insufficient fresh water; Phillip also believed the swampy foreshores would render any colony unhealthy as the bay was open and unprotected, the water was too shallow to allow the ships to anchor close to the shore, and the soil was poor.

The area was studded with enormously strong trees. When the convicts tried to cut them down, their tools broke, and the tree trunks had to be blasted out of the ground with gunpowder. The primitive huts built for the officers and officials quickly collapsed in rainstorms. Crucially, Phillip worried that his fledgling colony was exposed to attack from Aboriginal peoples or foreign powers. Although his initial instructions were to establish the colony at Botany Bay, he was authorised to establish the colony elsewhere if necessary. As such, Phillip decided instead to move to the excellent natural harbour of Port Jackson to the north.

On the morning of 24 January, the French exploratory expedition of Jean-François de Galaup, comte de Lapérouse was seen outside Botany Bay. On 26 January, the Supply left the bay to move up to Port Jackson and anchor in Sydney Cove. On the afternoon of 26 January, the remaining ships of the First Fleet arrived at Sydney Cove. In 1789, Captain John Hunter surveyed Botany Bay after returning from the Cape of Good Hope, trading for grain. The good supply of fresh water in the area led to an expansion of its population in the 19th century.

The western shore of Botany Bay remained in its virgin state for almost 50 years after the initial settlement of Sydney Town. Access to the area was difficult until a route from the west was established via Canterbury, New South Wales. As this route developed, it became known as Illawarra Road, which remains one of the main access routes to the eastern suburbs of Sydney. The land nearer to this crossing of Cooks River was cleared and settled quite early in the infancy of the new colony.

== Landmarks ==
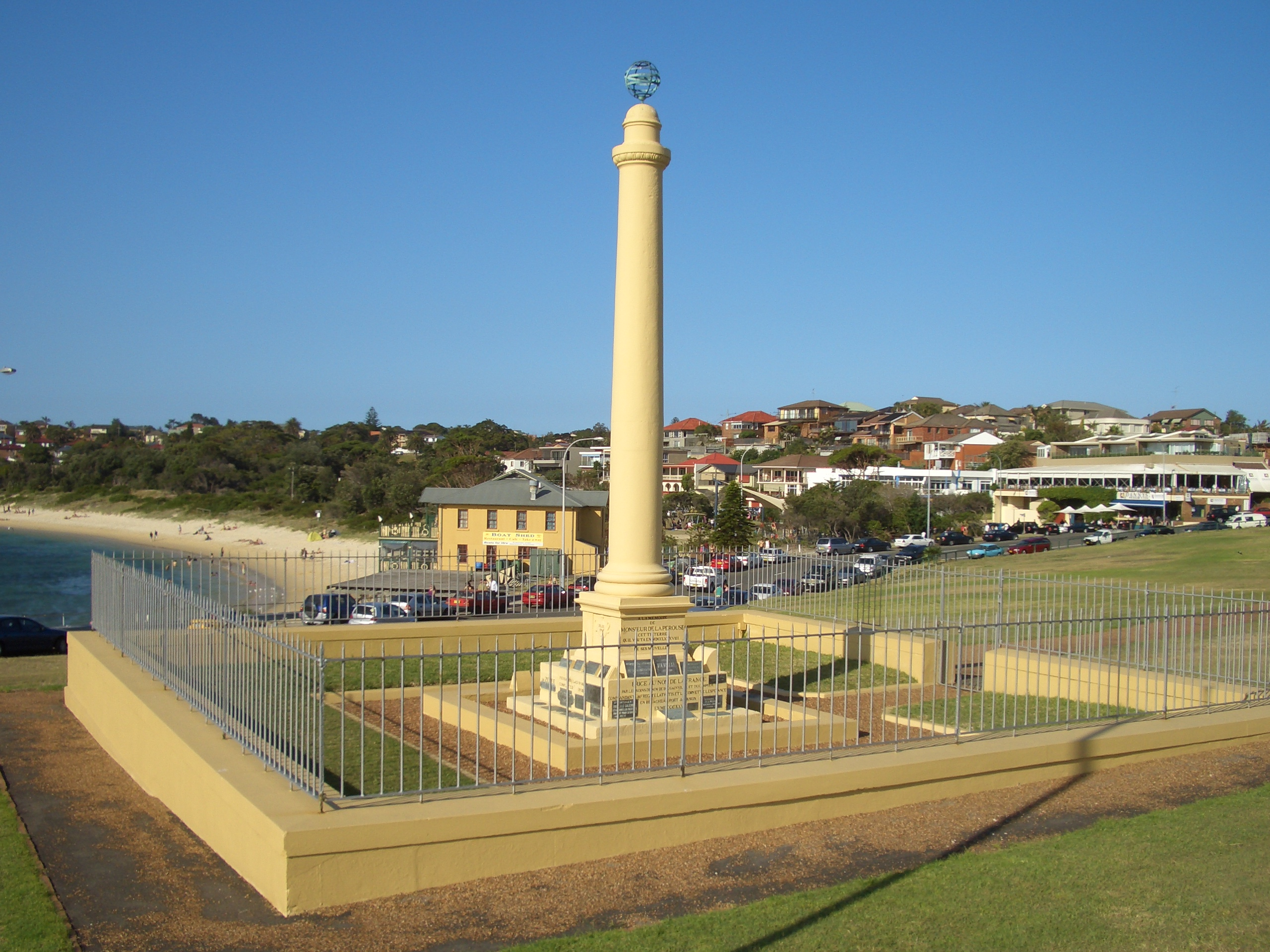
Monument at La Perouse

Sydney Airport, Australia's busiest airport, sits on the northwestern side of Botany Bay. Some of its runways go out into the bay. After World War II the mouth of the Cooks River was moved two kilometres west to make way for the airport extension. Land was reclaimed from the bay to extend its first north–south runway and to build a second, parallel runway.

The first container terminal at Port Botany, located east of the airport, was completed in the 1970s and is the largest container terminal in Sydney. A second container terminal was completed during the 1980s, and bulk liquid storage facilities are located on the northern and southern edges of the bay. A third container terminal was completed in 2011.

The land around the headlands of the bay is protected by the NSW National Parks & Wildlife Service as Kamay Botany Bay National Park. On the northern side of the mouth of the bay is the historic site of La Perouse, and to the south is Kurnell. Despite its relative isolation, the southern shore of the bay is dominated by an unusual mixture of pristine national park and heavy industrial use that includes Sydney Desalination Plant, the Caltex Fuel Terminal, sewer treatment, and historical sand mining facilities. On the southern side of the bay a section of water has been fenced off under the authority of the NSW National Parks & Wildlife Service at Towra Point for environmental conservation purposes.

The western shores of the bay feature many popular swimming beaches including Lady Robinsons Beach and are highly urbanised.

There are also a lot of bunkers around Botany Bay. The bunkers were built by the military during World War II and still remain in place.

== Marine life ==
Botany Bay has a diverse marine population, and the area around its entrance is a popular spot for scuba diving. In 2008, the Botany Bay Watch Project began with volunteers assisting to monitor and protect the Botany Bay Catchment and its unique marine life.

The world's largest population of weedy sea dragons ever surveyed is found at the 'Steps' dive site, on the Kurnell side of Botany Bay National Park. Weedy sea dragons are just one of hundreds of territorial marine creatures found within Botany Bay. The eastern blue groper is the state fish of New South Wales; it is very tame and is commonly found following divers along the shoreline of Botany Bay.

== In popular culture ==
- Despite the move to Sydney Cove, for many years the Australian penal colony would be referred to as "Botany Bay" in England, and in ballads such as "The Fields of Athenry", by Irish songwriter Pete St. John.
- A song named "Botany Bay" has been performed as a folk and music hall song since the 1890s, based on older tunes. It also refers to the penal colony.
- A song entitled "The Shores of Botany Bay" was written by Brian Warfield and recorded by The Wolfe Tones in the early 1970s. This satirical song deals with a group of Irishmen volunteering for the transportation process in the hopes of finding wealth in Australia.
- A song titled "Bound for Botany Bay" is featured on Irish singer-songwriter and guitarist John Doyle's album Shadow and Light.
- In the 1941 historical novel Botany Bay by Charles Nordhoff and James Norman Hall, the protagonist, after various adventures and misadventures in England, gets transported to Botany Bay. A movie based on the book starring Alan Ladd and James Mason was shot in 1953.
- The song "Jim Jones at Botany Bay" (aka "Jim Jones") is about a prisoner who is going to Botany Bay. The song has been recorded several times, including a well-known version by Bob Dylan, and sung by Jennifer Jason Leigh in The Hateful Eight.
- SS Botany Bay was the name of the spaceship on which Khan Noonien Singh and his followers escaped from Earth in the "Space Seed" episode of Star Trek: The Original Series, and Star Trek II: The Wrath of Khan.
- In the play and musical Sweeney Todd: The Demon Barber of Fleet Street, Benjamin Barker, the man who would become Sweeney Todd, was transported to Botany Bay for life on a false charge by Judge Turpin.
- In the MMORPG Runescape, Botany Bay is the name of a location in-game where players can view other players' accounts being penalised for using "bots", computer macros, to cheat.
- The 2015 7-part British TV series Banished was a dramatisation of the first few weeks of the penal colony.

== Gallery ==
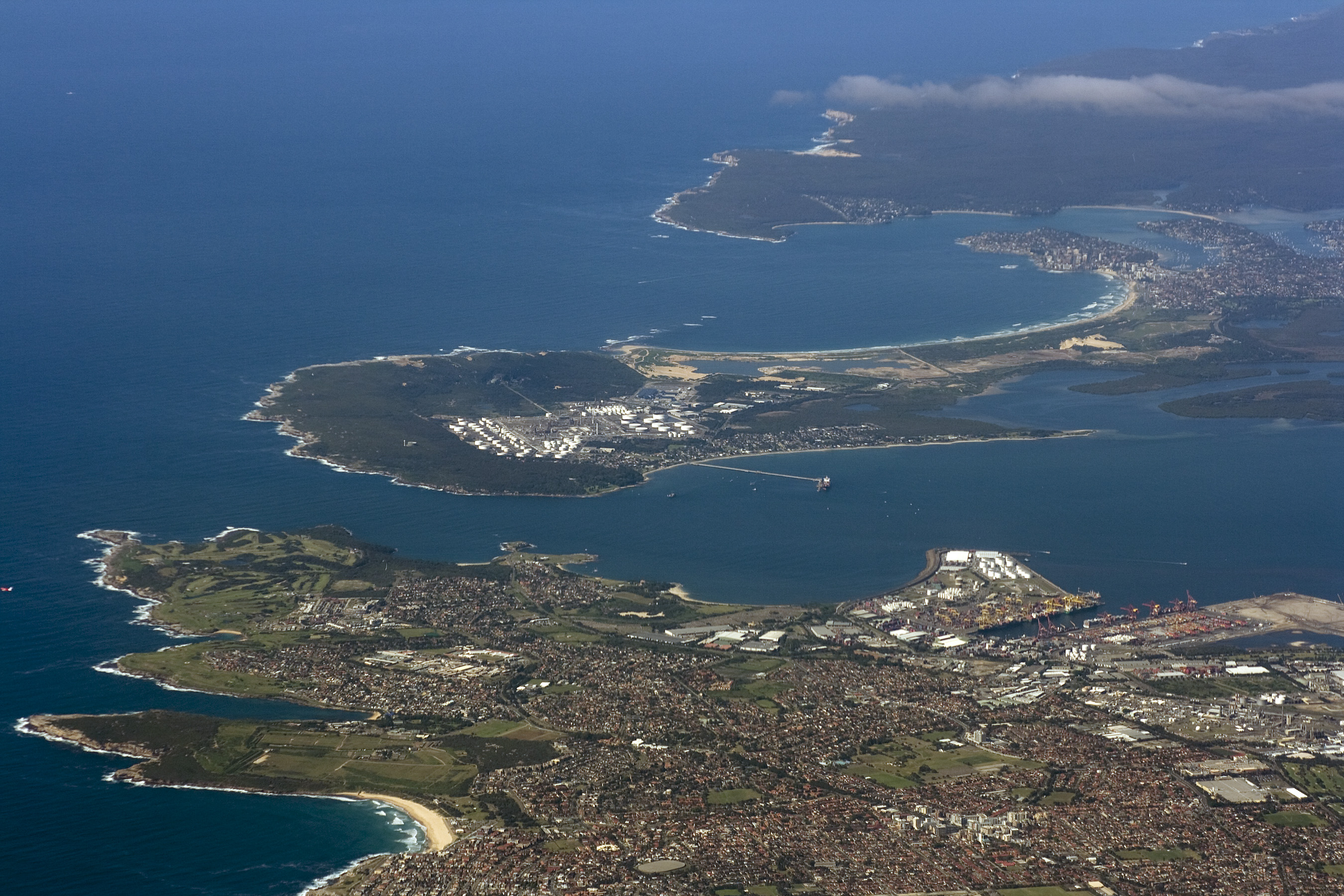
Aerial view of Kurnell, La Perouse, Cronulla and Botany Bay

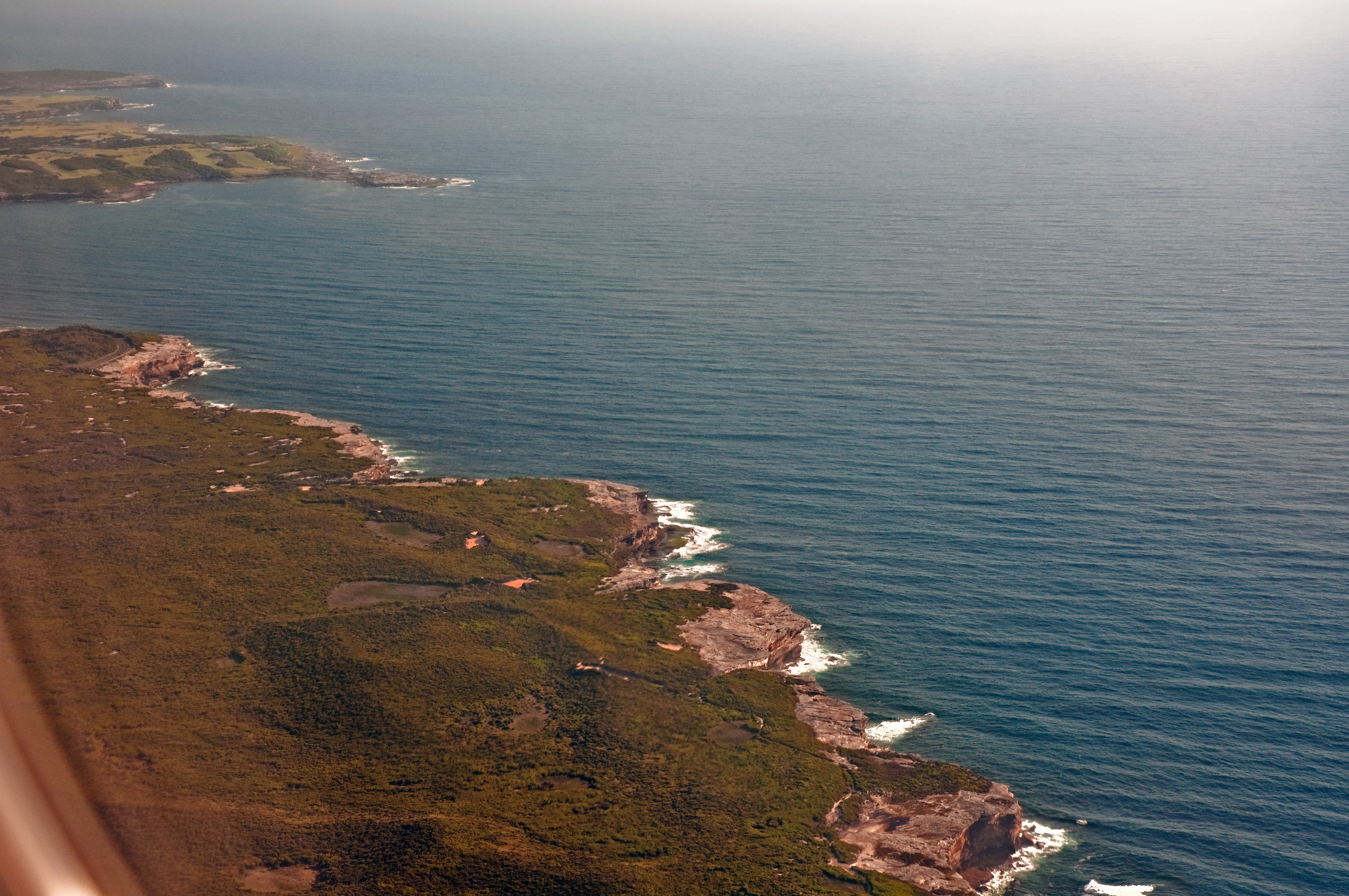
The mouth of Botany Bay as it meets the Tasman Sea, as viewed from the air, above Kurnell

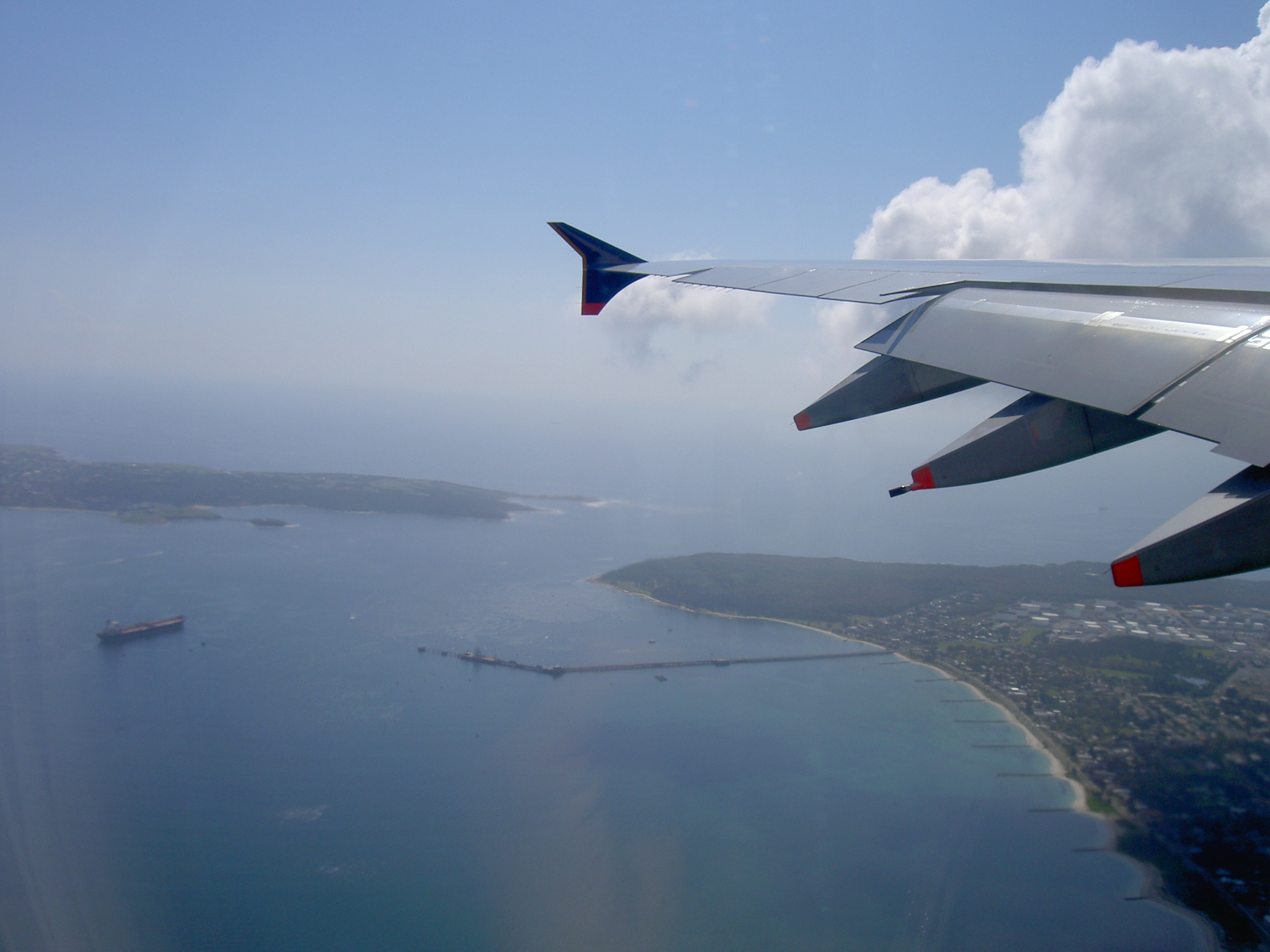
The mouth of Botany Bay from the air

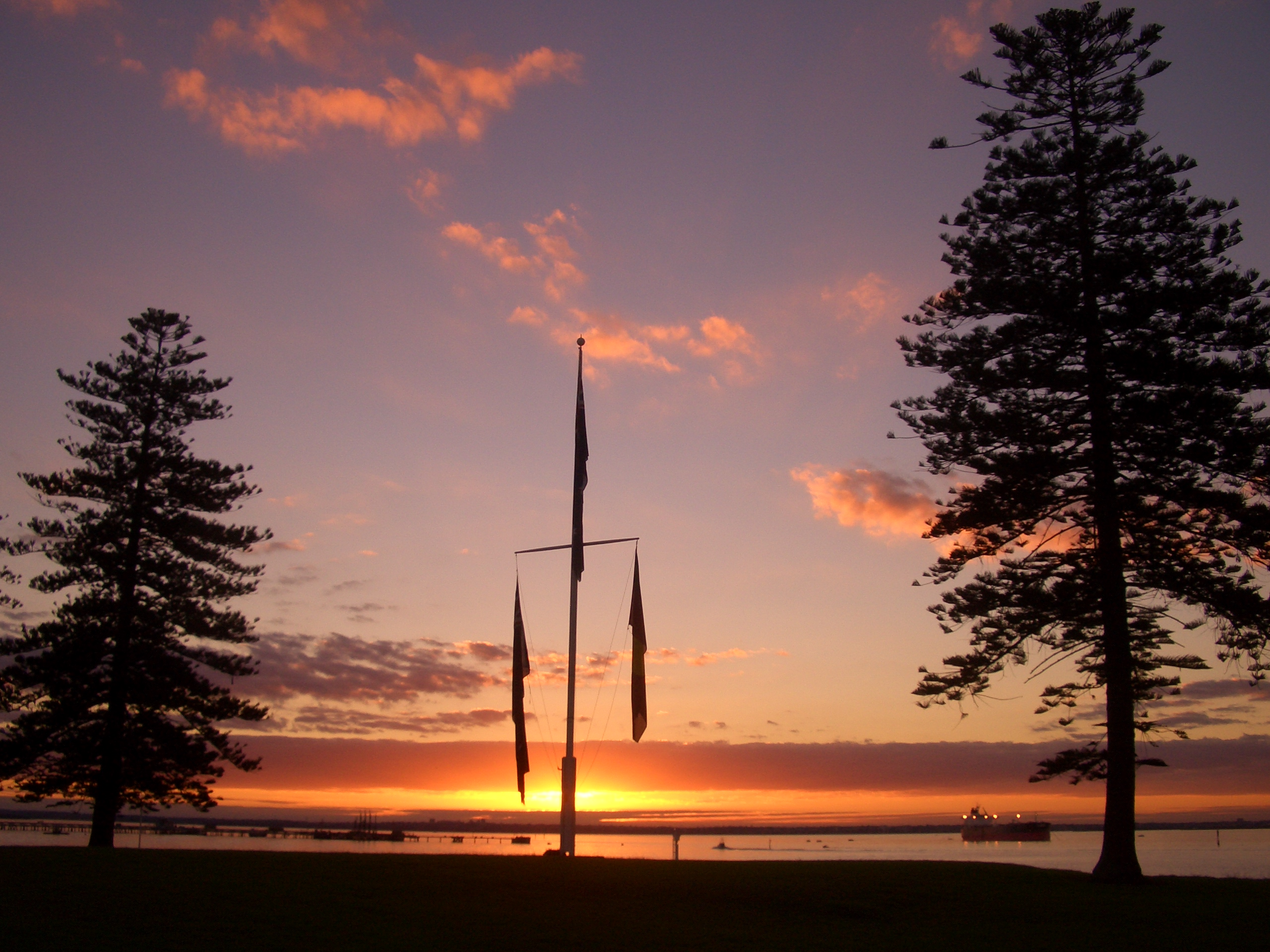
Botany Bay, view from Kurnell

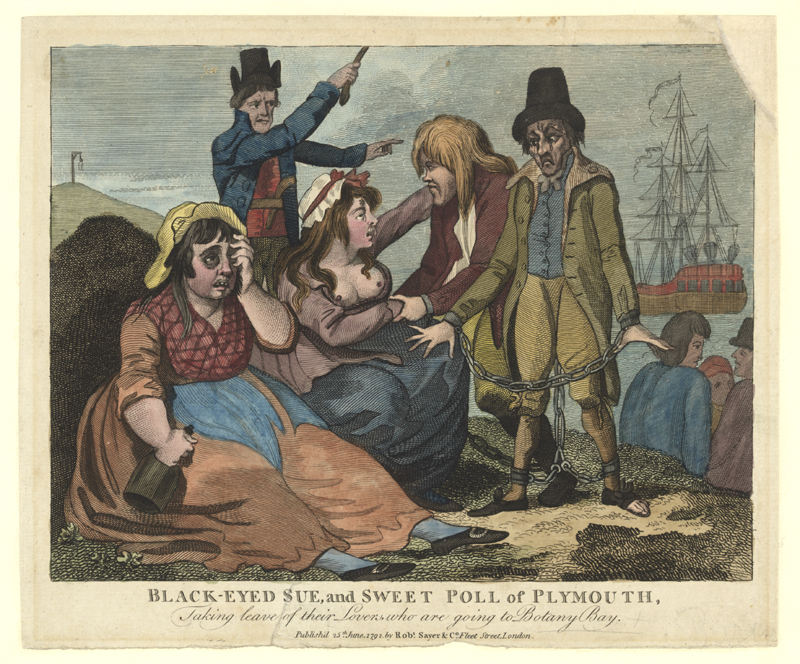
Black-eyed Sue and Sweet Poll of Plymouth, England, mourning their lovers who are soon to be transported to Botany Bay, 1792

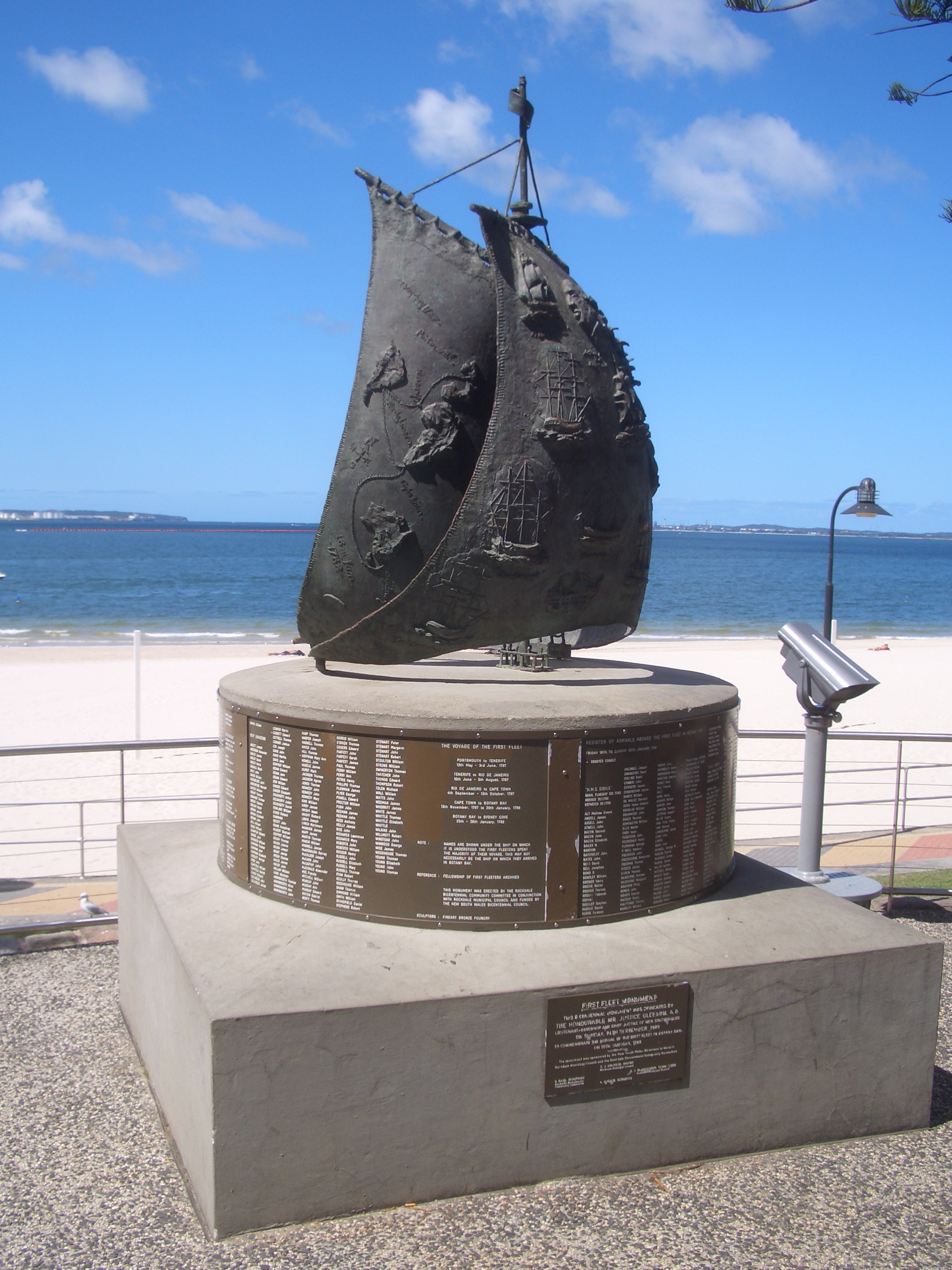
Bicentennial Monument at Brighton-Le-Sands

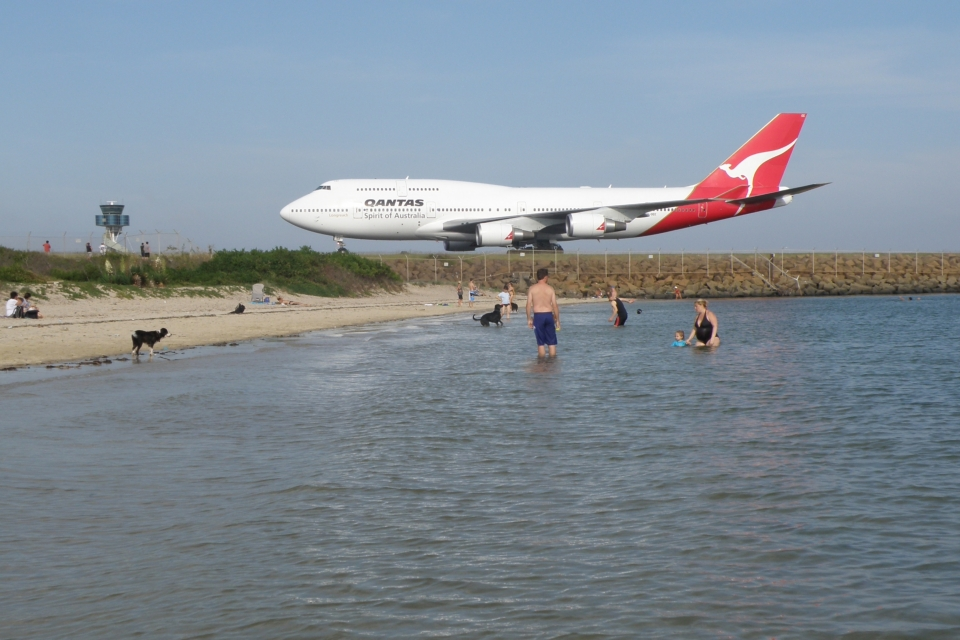
Sydney Airport runway near Botany Bay beach

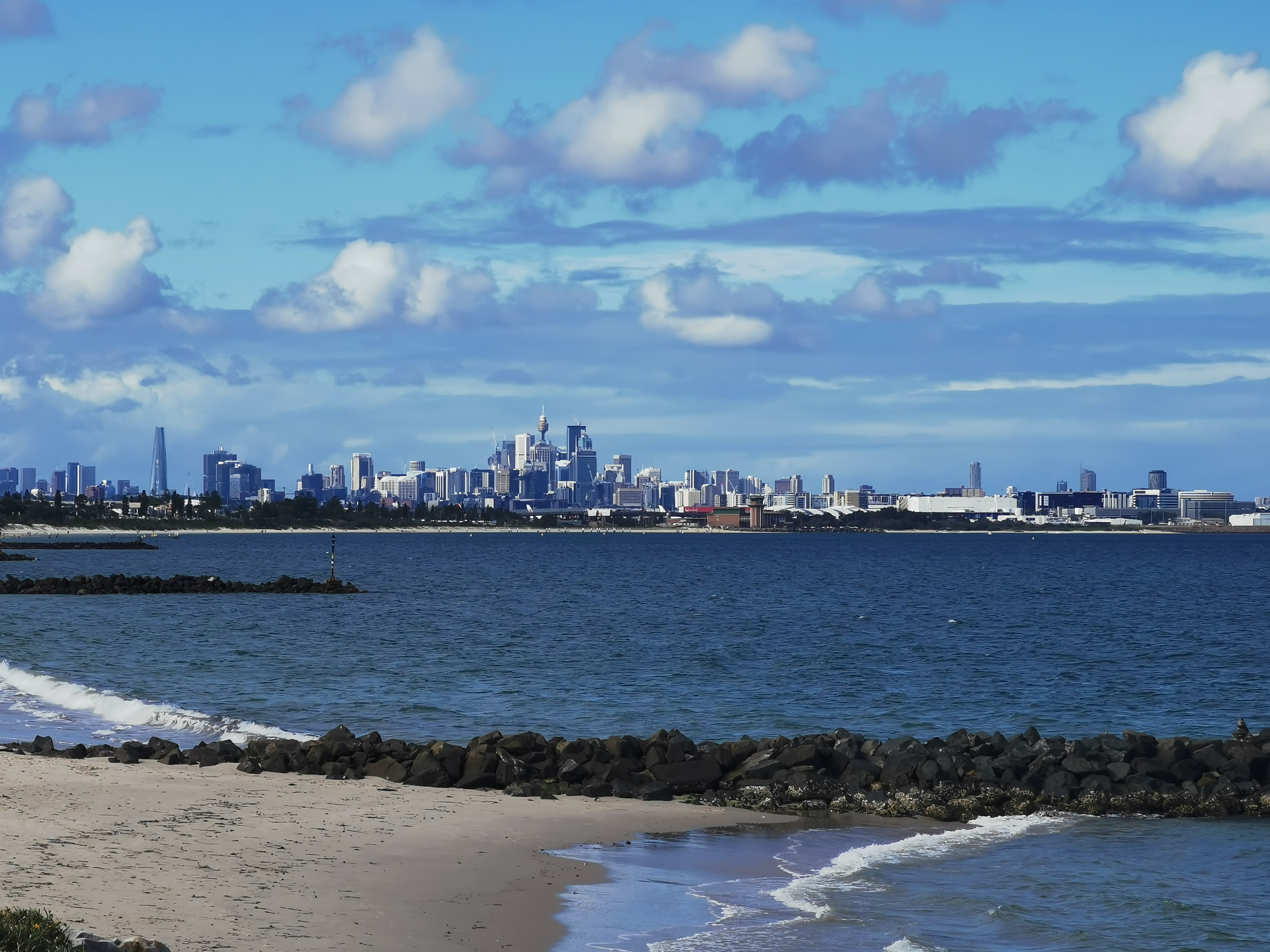
Sydney CBD skyline viewed from Botany Bay
