= Kamay Botany Bay National Park =

- IUCN category V (protected landscape/seascape)
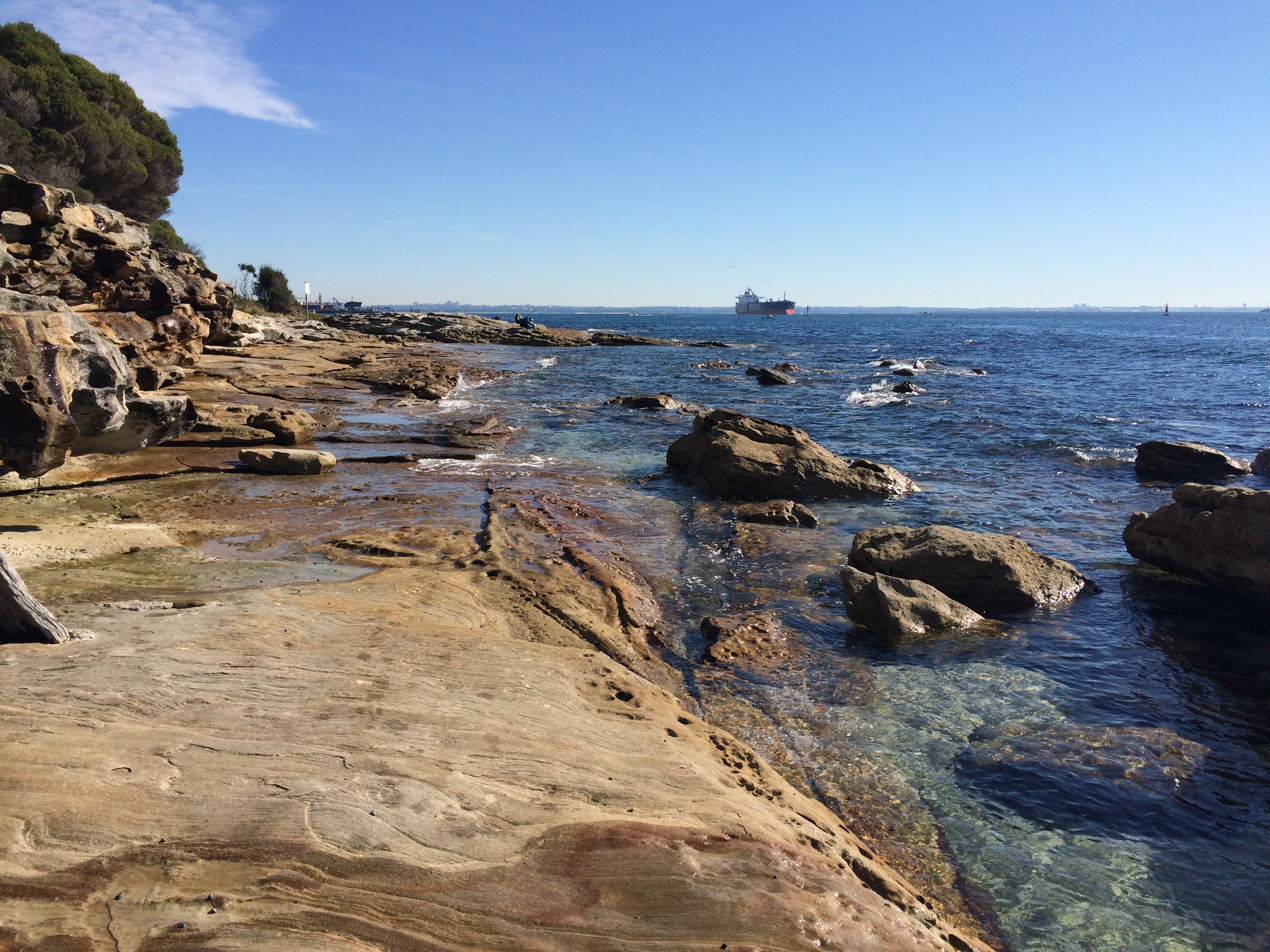
- A view across Botany Bay from Inscription Point.

- Location within New South Wales
- Location: New South Wales
- Nearest city: Sydney
- Coordinates: 34°01′14″S 151°13′29″E
- Area: 4.56 km^{2} (1.76 sq mi)
- Established: 23 November 1984
- Governing body: NSW National Parks & Wildlife Service

Kamay Botany Bay National Park
- Location within east Sydney
- 34°01′10″S 151°13′33″E
- Location: Kurnell/La Perouse in Sydney, New South Wales, Australia

Site notes
- Owner: NSW Office of Environment and Heritage

Australian National Heritage List
- Official name: Kamay Botany Bay: botanical collection sites, Captain Cook Dr, Kurnell, NSW, Australia
- Type: Listed
- Designated: 10 September 2017
- Reference no.: 106162
- Type: Historic site
- Place File No: 1/16/035/0034

New South Wales Heritage Register
- Official name: Kamay Botany Bay National Park (North and South) and Towra Point Nature Reserve; La Perouse Monument; Tomb of Père (Fr.) Receveur; Macquarie Watchtower; Cable Station
- Type: State heritage (complex / group)
- Designated: 29 November 2013
- Reference no.: 1918
- Type: Historic site
- Category: Aboriginal

The Kamay Botany Bay National Park is a heritage-listed protected national park in the eastern part of Botany Bay in Sydney, New South Wales, Australia. The 456-hectare (1,130-acre) national park is situated approximately 16 kilometres (9.9 mi) south-east of the Sydney central business district, on the northern and southern headlands of Botany Bay. The northern headland is at La Perouse and the southern headland is at Kurnell.

The visitor attraction, natural conservation and heritage conservation area at Cape Solander Drive is also known as Kamay Botany Bay National Park (North and South) and Towra Point Nature Reserve, La Perouse Monument, Tomb of Père (Fr.) Receveur, Macquarie Watchtower and Cable Station. The property is owned by NSW Office of Environment and Heritage and managed by the NSW National Parks & Wildlife Service, both agencies of the Government of New South Wales. Kamay Botany Bay was added to the New South Wales State Heritage Register on 29 November 2013, and was added to the Australian National Heritage List on 10 September 2017. It is also included in a UNESCO World Heritage serial nomination "The Rise of Systemic Biology".

The area is recognised for its outstanding cultural and historic heritage values to Australia. It is a place where botanist Sir Joseph Banks and naturalist Daniel Solander collected plant specimens in 1770 as part of the first landing of Endeavour in Australia. Banks and Solander collected many iconic Australian plant species, including some type specimens; these have important scientific and research value. The national park is also the site where Captain James Cook first set foot on Australian soil in 1770, marking the beginning of Britain's interest in Australia.

== History ==
=== Geological history ===
Botany Bay lies within a small tectonic depression known as the Botany Basin which in turn is situated within the larger Sydney Basin comprising modified sedimentary deposits laid down about 270 million years ago during the Permian period. The northern and southern headlands feature cliffs of Hawkesbury sandstone cliffs, which was formed during the Triassic period, between 200 and 250 million years ago.

On the Kurnell Peninsula, about 20,000 years ago at the height of the ice age, the Kurnell headland was a sandstone hill. The old dunes formed much of what is now Botany Bay and the Kurnell headland. Between 18,000 and 10,000 years ago, as the sea level rose, seagrass, salt marsh and mangroves developed and moved inland. The first evidence of Indigenous occupation of the area appears to be about 12,000 years ago. At this time the swales of the old dunes contained swamps.

By 7,400 years ago the sea level stopped rising and the cliffs and rock platforms at Kurnell were eroded by wave action to form sheer cliffs. Between 9,000 and 6,000 years ago the Kurnell isthmus began to form as the mud and sand of the Georges River built up.

The locations now known as Silver Beach and Bonna Point were subject to a buildup of sand from about 6,500 years ago. At about the same time a series of parallel dunes formed behind Bate Beach and Towra Point as the Georges River estuary shifted and sand and mud were dropped to the north of the Kurnell isthmus. The mud and sand deposit breached sea level and a dune formed on the deposit. This dune was vegetated with Kurnell dune forest, treed wetland, littoral rainforest, mangroves, sheoaks and saltmarsh.

From 4,500 years ago swamps developed in the low parts of the dunes and a series of moving dunes formed as a result of violent weather events. These new dunes covered the peninsula and the tidal flats of Botany Bay. Here again, swamps formed in these new dunes, allowing soils and dune forest to develop. As these dunes eroded, sandstone was exposed and eventually sandstone heath colonised that area. Between 3,000 and 2,000 years ago the sea level dropped to current levels.

=== Aboriginal people pre-contact ===
Most archaeological evidence relates to Indigenous occupation in the area from about 3,000 to 2,000 years ago. People living to the south of Botany Bay to Nowra spoke the Dharawal language group. The people moving through and living in the Kurnell area were the northernmost clan of the Dharawal speakers, the Gweagal. On the northern headland the people were most likely Cadigal people of the Darug language group.

The people living on the headlands and shores at the entrance to Botany Bay benefited from the many food and other resources and the mild climate of the area. On both shorelines are many midden sites providing evidence of the rich variety of sea foods enjoyed by the Indigenous people, as well as reptiles and mammals which also lived in the heath and forests. Fishing was the major source of food for the Indigenous people of the area. Fish hooks were made from turban shells, and fishing lines and nets were made from bark and native grasses. Timber from the forests at Kurnell and La Perouse provided bark for huts, canoes, and coolamons, and lomandra leaves were woven together to make bags.

Many of the local plants were edible, such as the roots of the common fern and warrigal, a spinach-like leafy plant that grew along the local fresh water streams on both northern and southern headlands. Other foods included the nectar from Banksia flowers and witchetty grubs which lived in the stems of banksia and wattle.

Because of its bountiful resources, the north and south headlands of Botany Bay were important ceremonial gathering places for the Dharawal on the south of Botany Bay and the Darug on the northern shores. At Kurnell there are several important ceremonial sites, including a bora ring used for rites and an ochre pit located near the current site of the oil refinery which provided pigment for such ceremonies.

Kurnell was possibly a semi-permanent home for the Gweagal. A marker tree distinguished by a ring-shaped hole in its trunk marks the site of a women's camp. The area also contains carved trees from which the bark for canoes and coolamons were taken and a women's birthing site, indicating the intensive use of the area by the pre-contact Gweagal community.

Aboriginal ancestral remains have been reburied in the park. These remains, taken from the Botany Bay region, were stored in various museum collections until repatriation. For Aboriginal people, the return of ancestors' remains to Country is highly significant because it then reunites ancestors with Country.

Similarly, the La Perouse section of the park contains evidence of everyday lives of Aboriginal people before European settlement, including middens and engravings that illustrate the everyday observations and preoccupations of the Indigenous people before European contact.

=== Arrival of Cook ===
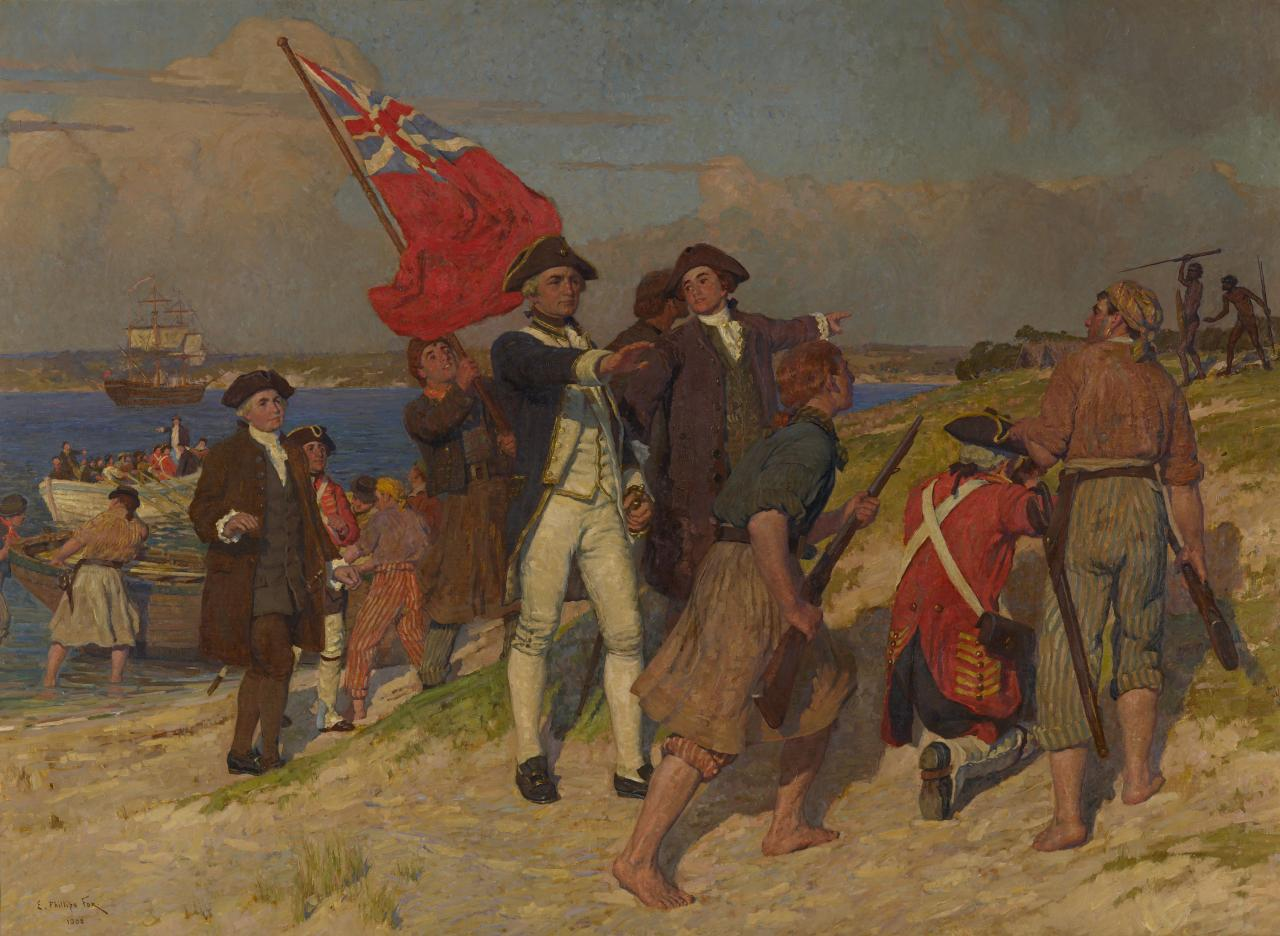
Cook landing with his crew

In the days preceding 29 April 1770 Dharawal people of the southern coastal area between Nowra and Kurnell observed a large "white bird" (oral tradition of the local people) or "floating island" which was Lieutenant James Cook's Endeavour, as it passed along the coast towards the headlands of Kamay ( Botany Bay). Further south the Yuin people attributed their sightings of the Endeavour to "Gurung-gubba", the pelican of their Dreamtime stories. The Endeavour entered Botany Bay and lay anchor opposite the location of a small bark hut village on the southern shores of Kamay Botany Bay. Here James Cook and some of his crew prepared to land on the shores of Gweagal country. It is now understood that Cook's bold arrival and landing on Dharawal land was a severe breach of Indigenous etiquette and an affront to the traditional owners of the land at Kurnell.

In traditional Aboriginal culture it is customary for visitors to wait to be invited to approach the custodians of that area, so when Cook and his men landed, the local people attempted to discourage the strangers from entering the land: two warriors painted in ceremonial ochre threatened the British with spears, to which Cook ordered either one or two muskets fired. One shot found its mark and hit one of the warriors, who ran to find a shield and continued the defence of his country. As Cook and his party landed, one of the warriors threw a spear before they retreated and commenced to ignore the intruders for the entire time the British were anchored in the bay. This is consistent with the customary right of country owners to demand to meet visitors on their own terms.

During the following eight days the passengers and crew of the Endeavour explored the shores and hinterland areas around Botany Bay. The main purpose of visiting Botany Bay was to obtain fresh water for the next leg of the journey. On the second day of their stay, Cook and his men found a stream located near the bark hut village, from which they replenished the ships water supplies. The stream still flows today.

The location of the Endeavour's landfall and Cook's claim of the east coast of the continent for Britain is now commonly known as Captain Cook's Landing Place.

One of the most significant activities undertaken that week was the botanical collecting by Sir Joseph Banks and Daniel Solander, noted pupil of Carolus Linnaeus. On completing his studies in Sweden, Solander travelled to England to promote the Linnaean system of classification and soon took up a position classifying collections at the British Museum. He was employed by Banks in 1768 to assist him on Cook's voyage of exploration.

Banks and Solander collected many plant and animal specimens at Botany Bay, including many which had not been collected or described previously and became the type specimens of species and genera, including the Banksia, named for Joseph Banks. Much of the collection work was carried out near the landing place and in the area now known as Towra Point and its wetlands, as well as on the northern shore of Botany Bay.

The extent and quality of the specimens collected led Cook to name the bay Botany Bay in acknowledgment of the important work undertaken by Banks and Solander. Besides being described and classified by Solander, every specimen was sketched by Sydney Parkinson. These sketches were rendered as watercolours when Banks and Solander returned to England and then engraved and later included in the publication Banks' Florilegium.

=== Arrival of Phillip ===
On 18 January 1788, eighteen years after the first visit by the British, Governor Arthur Phillip arrived at Botany Bay with the First Fleet, where they intended to establish the first British settlement in the colony. While anchored in Botany Bay a number of officers established seemingly friendly contact with the Aboriginal people, exchanging whistling tunes, confirming humanity and gender and exchanging gifts. On the southern shores they introduced a child travelling with the fleet to the Aboriginal people there.

Phillip was disappointed at the lack of water on the shores of the bay and dismayed by the large numbers of Aboriginal people inhabiting the place. By 26 January 1788, Phillip had left Botany Bay and sailed for Port Jackson, where the first settlement in Australia was made.

=== Arrival of Lapérouse ===
At the same time, Botany Bay was visited by the French expedition under the command of Jean-Francois Galaup de Lapérouse, whose frigates Boussole and Astrolabe anchored near Frenchman's Beach on 24 January 1788. Captain Hunter of the First Fleet established contact with the French in the absence of Governor Phillip.

The French ships had sailed from Samoa, where they had been involved in a battle with the Samoans. Numerous people on both sides were killed and injured. One of those injured in the event was the expedition's priest and naturalist, Père Receveur. Receveur died at La Perouse on 17 February 1788 and was the first French person to be buried on the mainland. He was interred in a headland grave marked with a common headstone. In 1829, a tomb was erected over the site of his grave.

The French spent six weeks at La Perouse, during which time they repaired damage done during the Samoan battle. An observatory was established on the northern headland for the use of Joseph Lepaute Dagelet, whose observations and scientific experiments are among the first European scientific endeavours in Australia. Dagelet undertook calculations on map positions of Botany Bay and carried out astronomical observations which he later shared with Englishman William Dawes.

The departure of Phillip and then Lapérouse from Botany Bay marked a period of time where, at least on the southern shores of the bay, Aboriginal people did not come into much contact with Europeans. The Kurnell headland was a remote spot and was not subject to a land grant until 1815. On the northern shores of the bay, the La Perouse peninsula remained relatively unsettled until the 1860s and 1880s, when a pioneering fishing community worked the waters at Botany Bay and lived in La Perouse.

While their land was not immediately settled by Europeans, white colonisation had a profound impact on the people of the area, the most significant being the spread of disease such as smallpox. There are caves at Little Bay just north of the northern section of the Botany Bay National Park and also a cave on Cape Solander in the southern section of the park in which it is believed that skeletal remains from these outbreaks were found, though this has not been confirmed.

=== Settlement during the 19th and 20th centuries: La Perouse ===
By 1830, the land which is now the northern section of Botany Bay National Park was dedicated as a Government reserve. From about 1820, a small contingent of Government troops were stationed at La Perouse headland to scout for the unexpected arrival of ships and to monitor and control smuggling activity. By 1822, these troops were housed in Macquarie's Tower, a sandstone castellated watchtower. From 1829, when the monuments to Lapérouse and Pere Receveur were erected, the watchtower was used as accommodation for a caretaker employed to look after the Lapérouse Monument and the tomb of Père Receveur. These monuments are still frequently visited by the French and are the site of events such as a memorial ceremony on Bastille Day each year, a mass to Père Receveur and Lapérouse Day.

In 1831, the watchtower was acquired by the Customs Department to house a tide waiter, or customs officer, and two boatmen who manned the La Perouse customs house outstation.

By 1869, in response to the perceived threat of armed attack by foreign forces, a program to bolster the colony's defences was in place and a military road was constructed to the La Perouse headland. By 1871 a gun battery was in place on Henry Head. In 1881 a large "mass concrete" fort was under construction on Bare Island; it was operational by 1890.

La Perouse headland was the site where the overseas underwater telegraphic cable emerged in 1876. The first makeshift facility of tents and huts was replaced in 1881 by a brick cable station sited centrally on the west of the headland overlooking Frenchman's Beach. After 1917, when it was no longer used as offices for the telegraph company, it became a nurses' home and later a home run by the Salvation Army. Most recently it is used as the La Perouse Museum.

Many Aboriginal people who had traditionally lived in the La Perouse area left after the establishment of European settlement, but by the 1870s Aboriginal people, including descendants from families associated with La Perouse and Botany Bay, along with Aboriginal people from the south coast, began to return to the area. When George Thornton, the government's Protector of Aborigines, started removing Aboriginal people from urban areas, he was successfully lobbied by a group from La Perouse, who were allowed to remain at the La Perouse camp. Thornton even constructed huts for them at the camp, justifying the decision to parliament by arguing that the camp was economically viable. By 1881 there were two camps with 35 Aboriginal people recorded to be living at La Perouse and a further 15 in Botany Bay within the boundaries of what is today Kamay Botany Bay National Park.

In 1881, there was an outbreak of smallpox in the colony. To deal with the epidemic, an isolation hospital was established at Little Bay; it became known as the Coast Hospital and then in 1934 became Prince Henry Hospital. Associated with the Coast Hospital is the Coast Cemetery, which is located south of the hospital and now is enclosed by Kamay Botany Bay National Park.

The Coast Hospital Cemetery is an Aboriginal Place and is an important burial, repatriation, and reburial site for the La Perouse and Metropolitan Local Aboriginal Land councils and Dharawal Aboriginal people. In 1881, the first part of the Coast Hospital Cemetery was opened. This section was used until 1897, when a northern burial section was established and used until 1952. The cemetery was used as a burial ground for the La Perouse Aboriginal reserve, though it served predominantly as a burial ground for patients who died of infectious diseases at Prince Henry Hospital. There are 90 marked graves in the Coast Hospital Cemetery, but it is estimated that up to 3,000 people are buried there. The area was selected as an Aboriginal repatriation and reburial site because of its long-standing significance to the local Aboriginal people. The cemetery contains the burials of several family members. Aboriginal ancestral remains were reburied within the Dharawal Resting Place (previously known as the Little Bay Cemetery Resting Place) in 2002 and 2005. Members of the La Perouse and Metropolitan Local Aboriginal Land councils and other Dharawal descendants regularly visit the area, maintaining close connections to Country and ancestors.

A small Anglican Aboriginal mission was established in the area in 1885 and a church built in 1894. In 1895 the camp at Frenchmans Bay, La Perouse was gazetted as an Aboriginal reserve. The people who lived there worked as fishermen, in the Chinese Gardens, or at the timber mills and wool washes in the area, or they made boomerang and other artefacts for sale to tourists, who flocked to the area after the construction of the tramway to La Perouse at the turn of the century. Many women and children crafted shell decorations for sale.

During the Great Depression, La Perouse was the site of a shanty town known as Happy Valley, which was located within the boundaries of the Botany Bay National Park behind Congwong Beach. Those who arrived at Happy Valley simply selected a spot and erected their home from corrugated iron or whatever could be found. Reputedly there was much positive interaction between residents at Happy Valley and those on the Aboriginal reserve. While life was hard at Happy Valley, some unemployed residents valued the site for its carefree existence and beach access. In 1939, after intense lobbying by the neighbouring golf club, Randwick Council moved all the residents to more suitable accommodation and demolished the shanty town.

During the 1960s, a wave of new white residents arrived at La Perouse and lobbied for the removal of the reserve at Yarra Bay. The Aboriginal community has resisted these efforts and the La Perouse community remains one of the strongest and most established Aboriginal communities in Sydney.

=== Settlement in the 19th and 20th century: Kurnell ===
In 1815, Governor Macquarie made a grant of 700 acres of land to James Birnie at Kurnell. Here Birnie established a farm, raising vegetables and stock and constructing a homestead on the site of the current Alpha House near Captain Cooks Landing Place in the Kamay Botany Bay National Park.

In 1821, another grant was made of 1,000 acres at the nearby Quibray Bay to John Connell, a free settler who arrived in NSW in 1801 and set up a large ironmongery in Sydney. When in 1828 Birnie was declared insane, Connell bought Alpha Farm, and by 1838 he owned almost the entire Kurnell Peninsula. His grandson John inherited the estate on John senior's death in 1851. He cleared the land heavily and sold the timber to the Sydney market.

Facing financial ruin in 1860, John Connell Jr mortgaged his landholdings at Kurnell to Thomas Holt, who took ownership in 1861. Holt, a successful wool merchant and member of the Legislative Council, was a prominent and influential figure in the New South Wales.

Holt established a scientific oyster farming program at Quibray Bay, attempted to raise sheep on specially planted pastures of imported grass and dabbled in timber and even coal mining on the Kurnell Peninsula. This work was done with the assistance of many employees, including a number of Aboriginal people such as William Rowley, a Gweagal man, who was also an enterprising local fisherman born at Towra Point.

Despite Holt's efforts at Kurnell, none of the enterprises were very successful, and by 1881 he began subdividing the estate. Even this exercise was not successful, and unsold lots within the current national park were set aside as a public reserve in the 1899, along with an area similarly reserved at an earlier date. The reserve, totalling 100 hectares at the time, was managed by a trust under the auspices of the Department of Lands.

From the 1820s Captain Cook's Landing Place was a popular destination for people with an interest in European history in Australia. Many people visited various places of interest, such as the plaque at Inscription Point, which had been installed by the Philosophical Society of Australasia in the early 1820s. In 1870 Thomas Holt erected Cook's Obelisk to mark the European arrival at Botany Bay. To cope with the area's increasing visitation, Holt built the first wharf at Kurnell just adjacent to the obelisk, and a steam ferry began to operate some time around 1882.

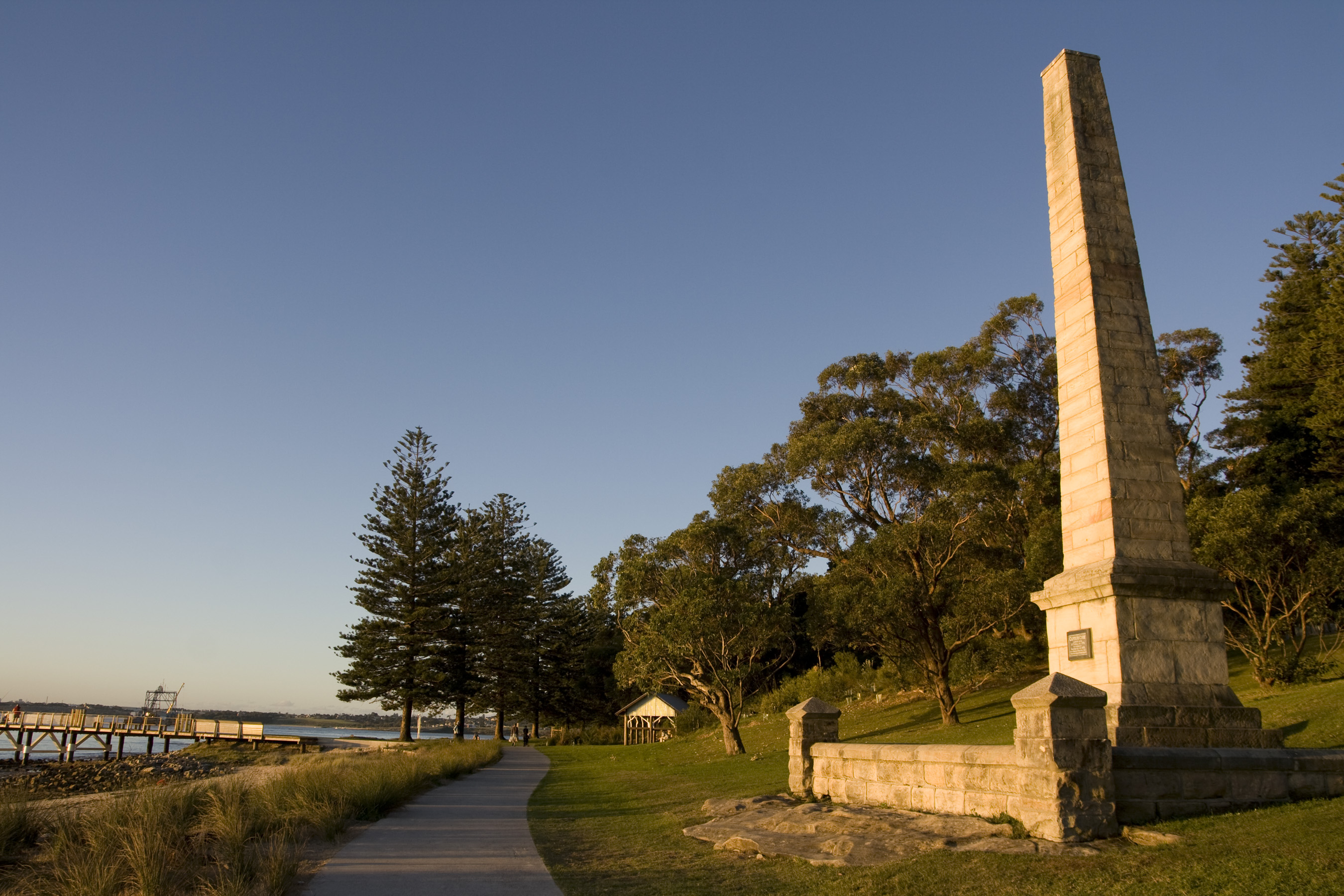
Captain Cooks Landing Place Reserve, a New South Wales State Heritage Register

The reserve was the responsibility of the Department of Lands up until 1967 and was managed by a trust right up until 1974. The trust employed a caretaker and field staff to maintain the reserve. It also spent considerable time and money on siting and erecting monuments to Cook and his crew. In 1918 the trust erected the Solander Obelisk and in 1947 the Banks Memorial.

A cottage was erected on the site of the first Alpha Farm House, providing accommodation for visitors as well as for the reserve caretaker, whose wife operated a kiosk from the kitchen.

In the years after the Second World War, under the management of the trust, the area became a hugely popular holiday destination for campers. Families who faithfully returned to camp there each year set up semi-permanent camps in small timber cabins and tents painted with calcimine for weatherproofing, with stoves and camp beds. Most of their food they brought with them, but fresh milk was sourced daily from the caretaker's wife, who managed a herd of cows which roamed the reserve. Holiday camping at the park continued until around 1977, when the NSW National Parks and Wildlife Service discontinued this use and disposed of the semi-permanent dwellings.

Like La Perouse, the Kurnell section of Botany Bay National Park had a shanty town. This was established in the cliff overhangs and caves overlooking the Pacific Ocean at Cape Solander and Tabbagi Gap. The earliest dwelling was built in 1919, and others were constructed during the Great Depression in the 1930s. These dwellings were constructed of tin and timber, and stoves and other home wares were installed to make the place comfortable. They continued to be used during the 1940s, 1950s and 1960s by recreational fishermen and local eccentrics.

The Aboriginal people of La Perouse retained a strong link with the Kurnell section of the Botany Bay National Park throughout the 20th century. Kurnell was a frequent destination for family groups who would travel over by ferry and spend the day fishing, swimming, foraging for bush foods. The banks of Cook's Stream was a source of warrigal greens, and further afield one could find five-corner berries, wombat berries and sarsaparilla.

Sonny Simms, who grew up at La Perouse in the 1930s and 1940s, recalled that the resources of the bay, its fish and shellfish, were an important supplement to the family's food resources when his father left and his mother became the sole provider for her family of nine children. The family would travel to Kurnell, where their mother taught them how to catch fish, lobster and abalone. The fish caught would be cooked in an old five-gallon drum and eaten on the spot.

Other resources found in the park and at Towra Point were the mangrove knees, which up until the late 1960s were harvested to make boomerangs for the tourist trade. The shells for the La Perouse women's shell craft work were collected from the beach at Wanda.

The huge sand dunes and their large freshwater ponds were a strong memory for Sonny Simms, who as a child regularly swam in these. The dunes survived relatively unaffected up until the 1950s, when the oil refinery was established there. It was not until the Sydney building boom in the late 1960s and 1970s that the demand for sand resulted in the dunes becoming degraded by sand mining over much of the Kurnell Peninsula.

In 1967 the reserve at Kurnell was handed over to the National Parks and Wildlife Service, which, besides its environmental charter, had custody of historic sites, of which Captain Cook's Landing Place at Kurnell was one. By 1974 National Parks and Wildlife Service was able to take on the full management of the park and the reserve trust was disbanded. The Botany Bay National Park was finally gazetted in 1988.

Under the management of National Parks and Wildlife Service much work has been done to redress the balance in articulating the Aboriginal and European historical and cultural values of the place. This is evidenced in the renaming of the longstanding Commemoration Day ceremony as the Meeting of Cultures ceremony and the structured involvement of local Aboriginal elders in the ceremony. In addition Aboriginal people have been closely involved in other important events in the park, such as the start to the Olympic Torch Relay in 2000, which was begun by one of the Aboriginal park rangers. A significant amount of work has been done to the interpret the history and connections of the site: in particular, the opening of interpretive walks and the re-opening of the freshwater stream.

Perhaps the most significant events to have been held in the park in recent years have been the repatriation burials. These events are of great importance to the local Aboriginal community as local elders received back the remains of their ancestors from public institutions where they were studied and regarded as curiosities in their own land. The La Perouse museum precinct in Botany Bay National Park is to be reinvigorated, with the NSW Government and Randwick City Council moving to lease the historic site.

== Description ==
The total area of the proposed listing is 878 hectares (2,170 acres). 492 hectares (1,220 acres) of the listing comprises Kamay Botany Bay National Park, situated on the north and south sandstone headlands of Botany Bay. The headlands create the dramatic entrance to Botany Bay, which is located about 14 km south of the centre of Sydney. The listing boundary also includes the Towra Point Nature Reserve, an area of 386.4 hectares (955 acres) of wetlands located to the west of Kurnell village in Botany Bay.

=== Northern section ===
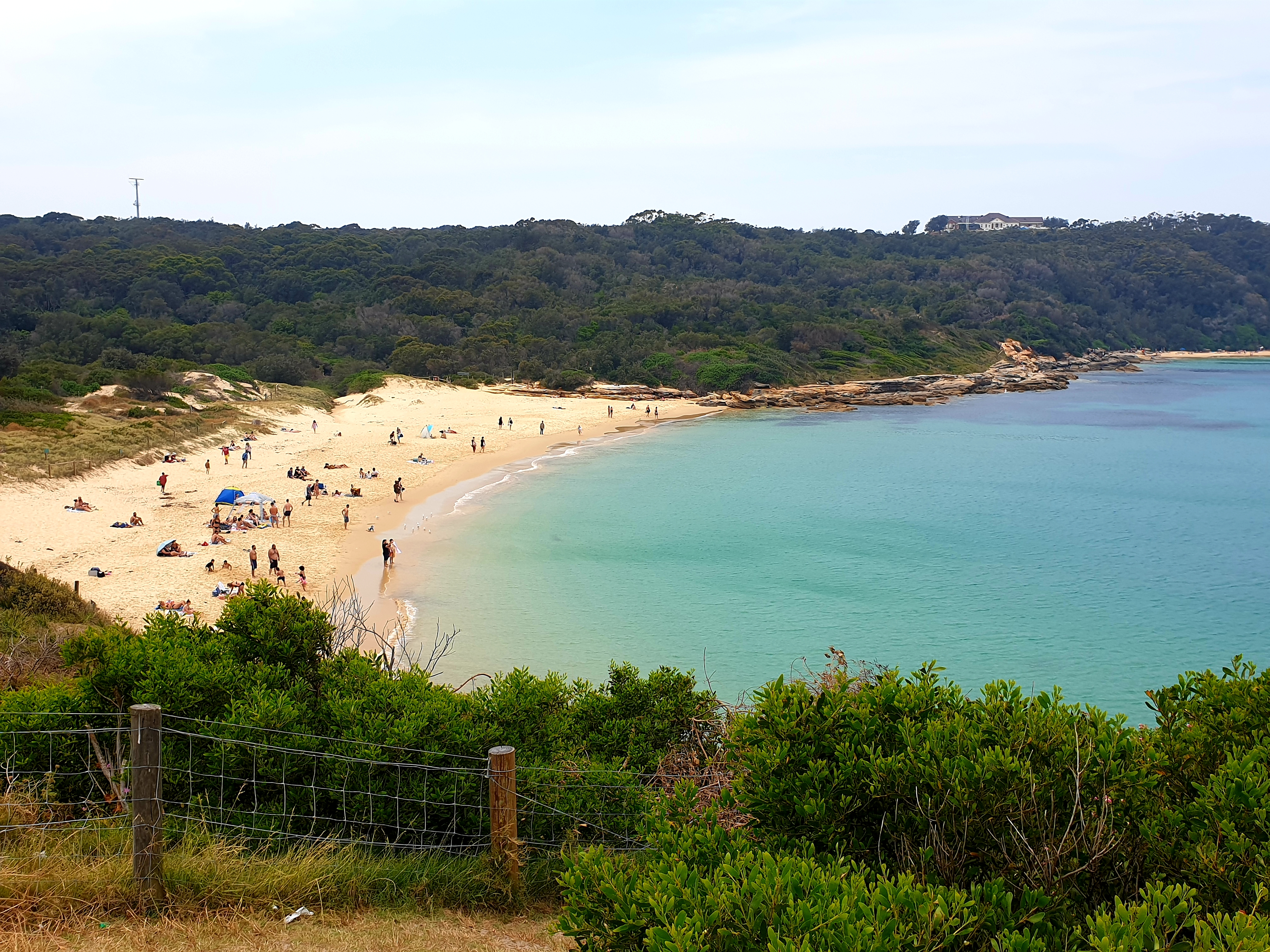
Congwong Beach

Approximately 168 hectares (420 acres) of Kamay Botany Bay National Park is located on the northern headland and includes Cape Banks, the coast land at Cruwee Cove, Henry Head, Congwong Beach, scrub-covered dune to Anzac Parade and the peninsula on the north-eastern corner of Botany Bay known as La Perouse Headland. As Bare Island and the causeway joining it to the mainland are already listed on the State Heritage Register, they are not included in the curtilage of this listing.

The coast is characterised by rocky sandstone cliffs demonstrating a fine example of the stratification of Hawkesbury sandstone. The cliff formations are punctuated by large gorges, the result of eroded basalt dykes which formed in the sedimentary rock in the early Tertiary period.

The sandy soils are covered with diverse vegetation comprising over 350 species once common in the eastern suburbs of Sydney, including rare species and communities. The most common vegetation cover is heath Banksia community (Banksia ericifolia), prickly tea tree (Leptospermum juniperinum) and paperbark (Melaleuca nodosa). To the west of the park is a thick covering of coastal tea tree scrub (Leptospermum laevigatum) consisting of coast banksia (Banksia integrifolia) and bangalay (Eucalyptus botryoides). In sheltered areas such as behind little Congwong Bay lies a low closed forest of smooth-barked apple (Angophora costata).

Rare vegetation communities in the park include the wet heath between Henry Head and Cape Banks and the closed forest around Happy Valley. The stands of Eastern Suburbs banksia scrub are considered to be an endangered community. An area of land bordering on Grose Street contains over 140 species, including plants regarded as rare and the last remaining example of the full diversity of Eastern Suburbs banksia scrub. It also contains several rare freshwater swamps. This part of the park attracts over 70 species of native birds, as well as possums, flying foxes, bats and snakes.

The northern section of Kamay Botany Bay National Park contains a number of sites relating to the pre-contact Aboriginal occupation, including rock engravings and shell middens.

The La Perouse Headland contains significant historic items including Macquarie Watchtower, Lapérouse Monument, Père Receveur's grave, the cable station (now the La Perouse Museum), the Coast Cemetery, fortifications including Henry Head Battery and Fort Banks, and the site of the Happy Valley settlement.

The Macquarie Watchtower is a two-storey, octagonal Sydney sandstone tower approximately seven metres (twenty-three feet) tall. The walls are topped by a castellated parapet that was reconstructed c. 1961. The structure has window openings which have been in-filled with sandstone blocks and an entry door on the southern facade.

The former cable station is a two-storey rendered masonry building situated on a grassy knoll of La Perouse Headland facing north overlooking Frenchman's Bay. The orientation of the building is attributed to the positioning of the telegraph cable, which came ashore at Frenchman's Bay. Designed by the Colonial Architects Office, the building has a single-storey veranda on its northern facade and a U-shaped plan. Originally symmetrical, the building has had additional bays added to either end of the building.

Also situated on the La Perouse Headland is a monument to the French expedition of 1788 led by Jean-Franois de Galaup Lapérouse and the grave of Père Receveur. The Lapérouse monument has a central obelisk topped by a spherical brass astrolabe. It is mounted on a base and surrounded by a low wall topped with a steel picket fence. Plaques have been placed around the monument commemorating the voyages of other French ships. The headstone and tomb of Père Receveur, the priest and naturalist of the French expedition, was erected many years after his death. The grave was initially marked by an inscription on a tree and over time became more formalised.

Behind Congwong Beach is the location of a former settlement known as Happy Valley, a collection of shacks erected during the Depression. The shacks have been removed and vegetation has regenerated. There is potential for archaeology dating from this period of occupation.

There are coastal fortifications located on Henry Head and Cape Banks designed and constructed by the British army from the late 19th century onwards.

Behind the headland is the original Coast Hospital Cemetery, which is now a designated Aboriginal Place: the Dharawal Resting Place – Coast Hospital Cemetery. It contains approximately 3,000 burials. There are some headstones and the remains of a paved stone road to the site. Aboriginal ancestral remains were reburied within the Dharawal Resting Place (previously known as the Little Bay Cemetery Resting Place) in 2002 and 2005.

=== Southern section ===
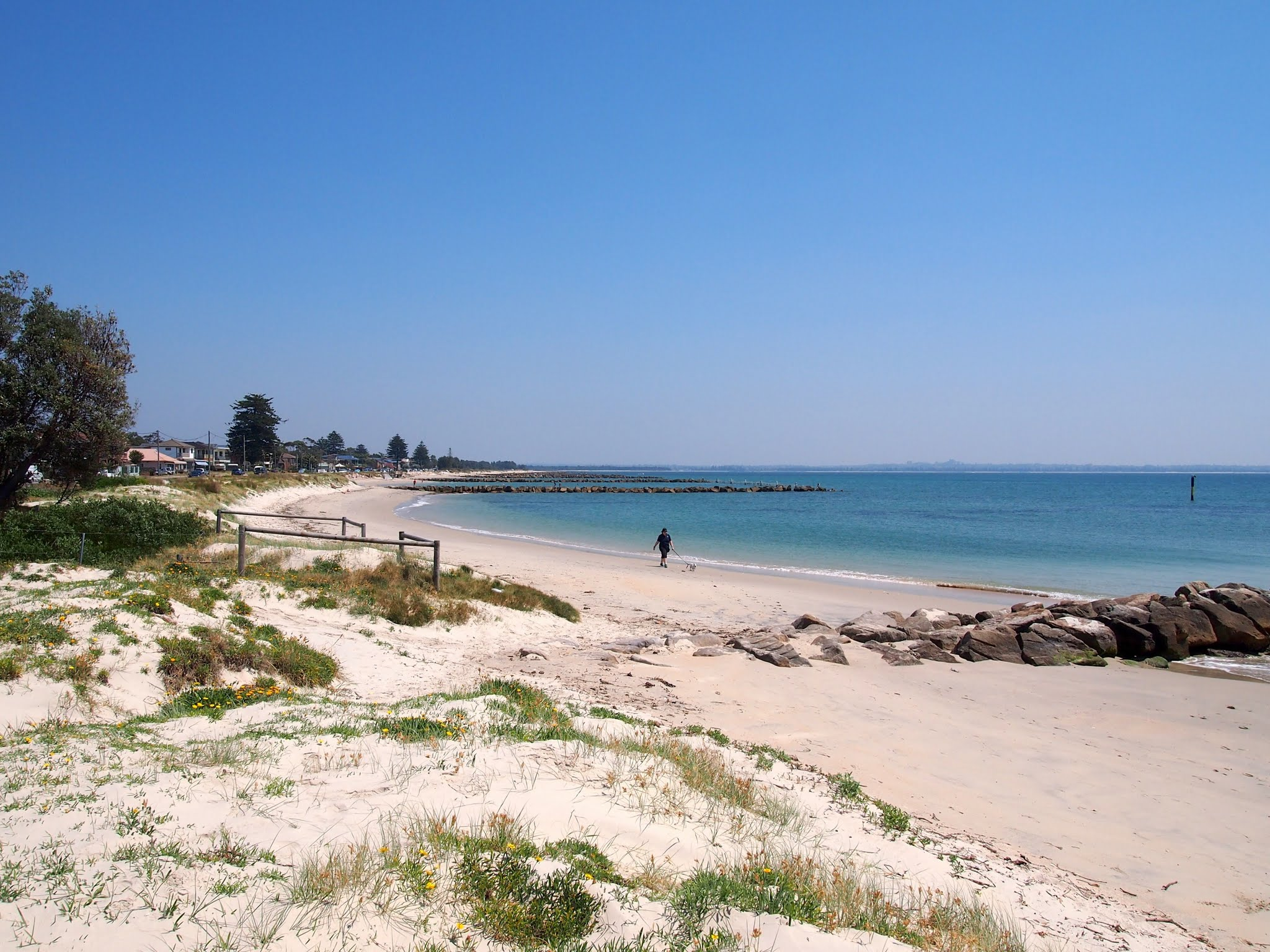
Silver Beach

The southern section of Kamay Botany Bay National Park covers an area of about 324 hectares (800 acres) on the eastern end of the Kurnell Peninsula. The area of the park to the north-east of Kurnell village is bounded by the waters of Botany Bay and large rock platforms.

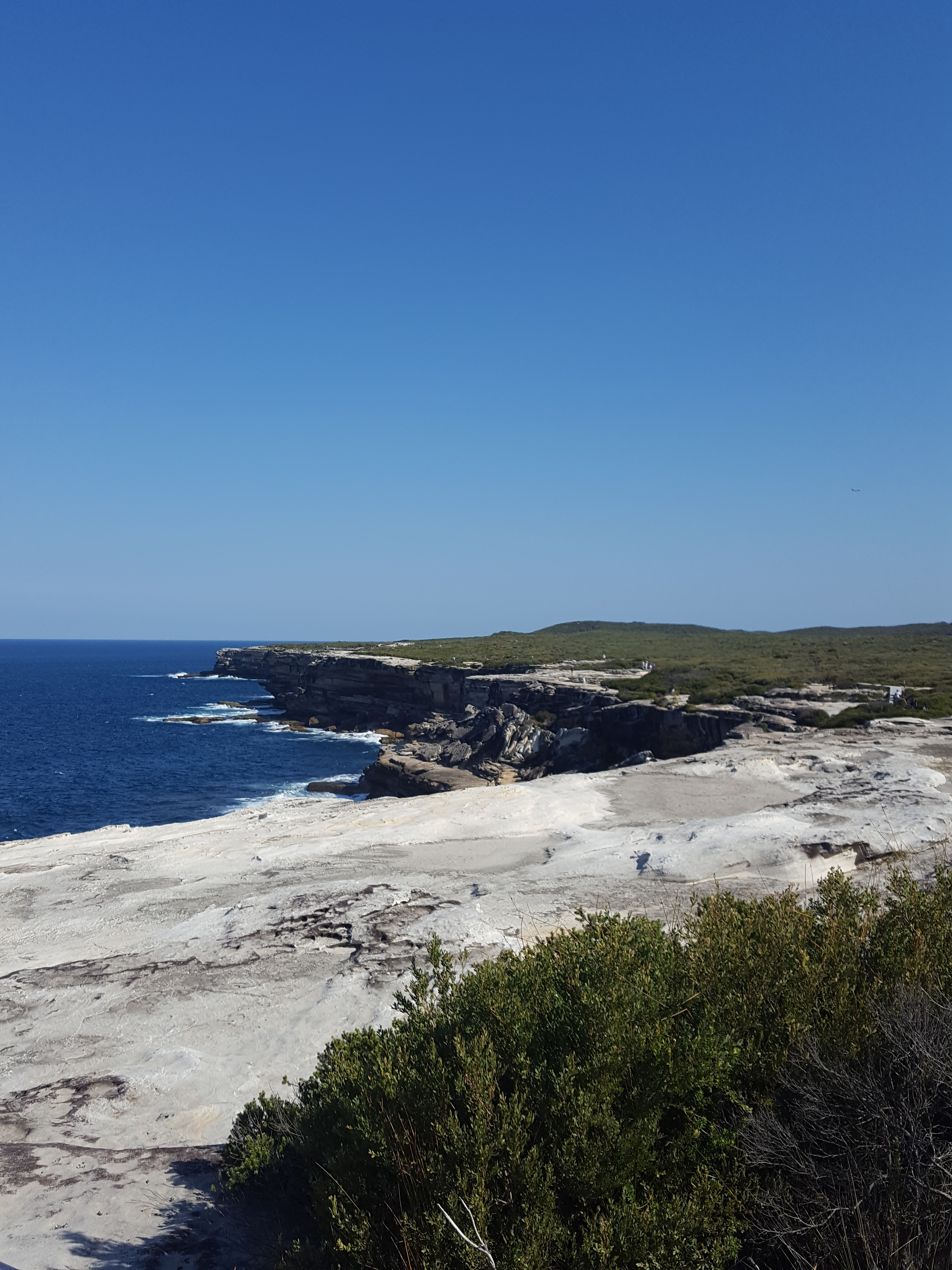
Cape Solander, toward the east of the Kurnell Peninsula.

This area, which is sometimes referred to as "The Meeting Place", extends over approximately 20 hectares (49 acres) of the eastern part of the park. Silver Beach is located here.

The Meeting Place precinct contains many items of pre-contact Aboriginal heritage: shell middens, burial sites, a bora ring, a birthing tree and other items of Aboriginal heritage significance. It also contains post-contact heritage items of significance to both European and Aboriginal history.

The Meeting Place contains a number of monuments and memorials to Cook; the botanist Solander; Sir Joseph Banks; and Forby Sutherland, an Endeavour crew member who died at Botany Bay. It also contains Alpha House, previously known as the Kurnell accommodation house, constructed by the Captain Cook's Landing Place Trust in 1902. The accommodation house was built on the remains of two earlier dwellings, and a cellar of one of these remains beneath the cottage.

An important element, historically and environmentally is the stream that flows into Botany Bay near the landing place. It was here that Cook and his party restocked their fresh water supplies under the eye of the local Aboriginal people. There have been a number of archaeological excavations in this area, on the flat between the wharf and the stream, and in the vicinity of the Alpha House site. The area is considered to have high archaeological potential. The place is marked by a plaque and by more recent interpretive works.

The southern and eastern boundary of the park follows the 40-metre (130 ft) high Hawkesbury sandstone cliff landscape of Cape Solander, which is punctuated by deep narrow gorges at Tabagai Gap and Yena Gap. Further to the south this rocky coastal boundary gives way to sand dunes which extend south to Potter Point. Within the cliff landscape and dunes of this area there have been archaeological excavations, these areas are also considered to have archaeological potential. Dune landscape characterises the southern part of the park inland. Vegetation is mainly Kurnell dune forest, which grows on the sand hills that overlook the coast where Cook is said to have landed. There are pockets of dry eucalypt forest on the higher reaches, and this forest continues over Cape Solander Drive and up to the sandstone heights approaching the sandstone cliffs falling to the ocean on the east.

The area down to Potters Point supports heath lands on sandstone and heath on dunes, which are characterised by old man banksia (Banksia serrata), sheoak (Allocasuarina distyla) and grass trees (Xanthorrhoea resinosa). There are also wetlands on sandstone and wetlands in dunes which sustain native grasses (Gahnia sieberiana and Scirpus littoralis), lemon-scented bottlebrush (Callistemon citrinus), and heath banksia (Banksia robur), which are rare in the Sydney region. As well as pockets of dry eucalyptus forest, there are also several pockets of Kurnell dune forest in the southern reaches of the park and important patches of littoral rainforest.

Among the diversity of fauna living on the Kurnell Peninsula are endangered or vulnerable species. The green and gold bell frog (Litoria aurea) and the tinkling froglet (Crinia tinnula), both threatened, have been recorded in the southern part of the park, along with the more common eastern long-necked tortoise (Chelodina longicollis). Ninety-six species of bird frequent the scrub, forest wetlands and shores of the Kurnell Peninsula. Some of the species noted to be of local, state or regional significance are the Japanese snipe, whimbrel, Arctic jaeger, common eastern tern, peregrine falcon, red-necked stint, powerful owl (threatened), silvereye, red-browed finch, New Holland honeyeater and superb fairywren.

=== Towra Point Nature Reserve ===
Within the nature reserve is the Towra Point Keeping Place Aboriginal Place, which is an Aboriginal reburial site where ancestral remains have been returned to Country. Evidence of past Aboriginal occupation (campsites evidenced by shell middens and stone artefact scatters) can be found in the local area. Local vegetation is dominated by sclerophyll forest and includes coast banksia and tea tree.

The Ramsar listed wetlands reserve of 386 ha is located on the shores of Botany and Wooloware bays to the west of Kurnell village. The Towra Point landscape of alluvial and marine sands supports vegetation communities that are now rare in the Sydney region. There are vegetated dunes and coastal banksia woodlands, littoral rainforest patches and stands of rare bangalay and swamp oak forests. There are also a few stands of the magenta brush cherry (Syzygium paniculatum), a species listed as vulnerable. The area contains saltmarshes which support a rare sedge, Gahnia filum, which grows at the edge of the marshes, located on the land side of mangroves. The Towra Point wetlands are home to a large variety of local and migrating wading and shorebird species, as well being the second most important breeding site for the little tern (Sternula albifrons) and the only breeding place in the Sydney region. Other species which live in the wetlands include the pied oystercatcher (Haematopis longirostris), terek sandpiper (Tringa terek) and peregrine falcon (Falco peregrinus), all of which are listed as threatened in NSW. Full details of the vegetation communities at Towra Point can be found in Towra Point Nature Reserve Plan of Management.

=== Features ===
A number of memorials commemorating Australia's history are located at the entrance to the Kurnell Peninsula portion of the park. This area has a coast walk connecting the memorials and is near the information centre and a museum.

The Kurnell Peninsula portion includes much of the eastern half of the promontory, adjacent to the Caltex Oil Refinery. The area is bordered by sandstone cliffs, eroded to a few metres above sea level in the north and higher in the south. The highest point is about 100 metres (330 ft) above sea level and there are two mapped lookouts, Kurnell Lookout and Houston Lookout. Hills of dry sclerophyll bushland include Botany Cone at 55 metres (180 ft) above sea level and Long Nose at 101 metres (331 ft). There are many small points and cliff formations and several walking tracks. The carpark and lookout at the end of the Yena Track is popular for whale watching in the migration season.

Also present in the park is the Cape Bailey Light, a lighthouse built in 1950.

== Heritage listing ==
As at 29 July 2013, Kamay Botany Bay National Park and Towra Point Nature Reserve are of outstanding state heritage significance as a rare place demonstrating the continuous history of occupation of the east coast of Australia. The place holds clear and valuable evidence of Indigenous occupation prior to European settlement and the natural history of the state. It is also the place where the shared history of Indigenous and non-Indigenous Australia began. It was the place where Lieutenant James Cook first stepped ashore to claim the country for Britain and plays a central role in the European history of arrival, the history of Indigenous resistance, dispossession and devastation through illness, land grants, cultivation and development.

Traditional Aboriginal custodians of the land and the current Aboriginal community have strong historical association with Kamay Botany Bay National Park and Towra Point Nature Reserve. Gweagal warriors resisted the arrival of Cook and continue to be important symbols of Aboriginal resilience. There are two important burial repatriation sites within the curtilage which are designated Aboriginal Places and have high social significance for the Aboriginal community.

The place is also significant for its historical association with important European explorers and scientists and their life's work. These include James Cook, Joseph Banks, Daniel Solander, Comte de Lapérouse, Père Receveur and Joseph Lepaute Dagelet. It is also associated with the First Fleet and the first Governor of NSW, Arthur Phillip.

The place is of state significance for the technical achievement of Banks and Solander who during their visit in 1770 made the first important collection of fauna and flora from Australia which included some items that had never before been described and classified. Previous archaeological excavations indicate that Kamay Botany Bay National Park and Towra Point Nature Reserve have significance for their high level of archaeological potential.

Kamay Botany Bay National Park and Towra Point Nature Reserve have aesthetic value as landmark headlands and natural areas with a collection of historic monuments that, combined, have important symbolism to the state of NSW. Both northern and southern parts of the national park, together with the nature reserve, contain a valuable research resource relating to Indigenous occupation, the natural history of the state and the early settlement of the colony.

Kamay Botany Bay National Park and Towra Point Nature Reserve are of state heritage significance as they contains rare remnant vegetation and flora communities and is a critical link in the network of parks and reserves that conserve the biodiversity of NSW.

The La Perouse part the national park provides evidence of the history of French exploration in the Pacific in the late 19th century and continues to have ongoing cultural associations with the French community today.

Kamay Botany Bay National Park was listed on the New South Wales State Heritage Register on 29 November 2013 having satisfied the following criteria.

The place is important in demonstrating the course, or pattern, of cultural or natural history in New South Wales.

The geological and botanical features of Kamay Botany Bay National Park and Towra Point Nature Reserve are of state heritage significance for their ability to demonstrate the natural history of the state.

Kamay Botany Bay National Park and Towra Point Nature Reserve also have the ability to clearly demonstrate Indigenous pre-contact history of the state and to demonstrate aspects of the way of life of the Aboriginal people before European settlement.

Kamay Botany Bay Park is of exceptional heritage significance for the state as the place where the shared Indigenous and European history of Australia began. It was the place where Lieutenant James Cook first stepped ashore to claim the country for Britain and the first meeting place between Indigenous people and the colonisers. The place plays a central role in the European history of arrival and the history of Indigenous dispossession and devastation through illness, land grants, cultivation and development. The meeting of Indigenous and non-Indigenous Australia is a story that is central to the development of the colony and of symbolic importance to the state .

Kamay Botany Bay National Park is historically significant as it was the first point of landing of the first fleet of settlers in Australia and the site of later developments in colonial defences and customs regulation. It also demonstrates the early development of communications in the colony. The park is historically significant as it contains evidence of French exploration during the late 18th century.

Kamay Botany Bay National Park and Towra Point Nature Reserve are historically significant as the place where Joseph Banks's and Daniel Solander's unique botanical collection was sourced and later classified using the Linnaean system of classification. Kurnell Peninsula and Towra Point were the sites of the first scientific investigation of the east coast of Australia by British scientists.

The former Cable Station at La Perouse is significant for its role in telegraphic communication connecting New Zealand with Australia by sub-marine cable for the first time in 1876.

The place has a strong or special association with a person, or group of persons, of importance of cultural or natural history of New South Wales's history.

Traditional Aboriginal owners of the land and the current Aboriginal community have strong historical association with Kamay Botany Bay National Park and Towra Point Nature Reserve. The place is associated with the Gweagal warriors who resisted the arrival of arrival of Cook and the crew of the Endeavour.

Kamay Botany Bay National Park and Towra Point Nature Reserve is significant for its association with important European explorers and scientists and their life's work. These include James Cook, Joseph Banks, Daniel Solander, Comte de Lapérouse, Compte de Receveur and Joseph Lepaute Dagelet.

Kamay Botany Bay National Park has an important association with the First Fleet and Governor Arthur Phillip, first Governor of NSW. Governor Macquarie is also associated with the site as he commissioned the erection of the earliest known sandstone tower building in Australia, the Macquarie Watchtower. The place is also associated with French explorers under the command of Comte de Lapérouse who were the first Europeans to stay in the place for an extended period of 6 weeks.

The Kurnell Peninsula has an important association with one of the colony's noted entrepreneurs and politicians, Thomas Holt. It also has historic association with members of the Aboriginal community who lived and worked with the first settlers on the Kurnell Peninsula and those who lived at La Perouse throughout the nineteenth and twentieth centuries and whose descendants continue to live in the area.

The place is important in demonstrating aesthetic characteristics and/or a high degree of creative or technical achievement in New South Wales.

The cliffs edging the seaside entrance to Kamay Botany Bay National Park in both the northern and southern sections have state heritage significance and carry symbolism as witnesses to the historic events that occurred after the Endeavour laid anchor inside Botany Bay and Cook stepped onto Dharawal land.

As well as the natural features of the site there are significant structures which have aesthetic value. The former cable station was designed by the noted colonial architect, James Barnet. The two-storey octagonal sandstone tower with castellated turret top built in circa1811, as a military guardhouse and lookout station, is a distinctive feature on the headland. The Doric column memorial to the Lapérouse expedition is another feature of the grouping on the northern headland. On the southern headland a commemorative obelisk marking Captain Cook's landing site erected in to 1822 is another distinctive landmark.

The green peninsula of Towra Point Nature Reserve is an aesthetically appealing natural landscape amidst an otherwise industrial or suburban setting on the south side of Botany Bay.

The place has a strong or special association with a particular community or cultural group in New South Wales for social, cultural or spiritual reasons.

Both the northern and southern sections of the Botany Bay National Park are of state heritage significance for members of the local and statewide Aboriginal community as it is the site of the first meeting of Indigenous and European cultures. For many people who live locally and throughout the state it is the home of their ancestors, it is the place where their ancestors are buried and where they lived before Europeans arrived. It is also important to Aboriginal people as one of the earliest sites of resistance to British colonisation. The place is also an important site of cultural renewal as the story of the arrival of Cook and those that followed remains an important story within the Aboriginal community.

The Towra Point Keeping Place Aboriginal Place and the Dharawal Resting Place - Coast Hospital Cemetery repatriation sites are highly significant places to members of the La Perouse Local Aboriginal Land Council and the Dharawal Aboriginal people associated with Botany Bay. Visitation to these sites enables Dharawal people to maintain close connections to Country and ancestors.

Cook's landing place is important to the European community as it marks the arrival of the British and the establishment of Britain's southernmost colony. It is regarded as the birthplace of the European Australian Nation and the first meeting place of Aboriginal and British communities.

The northern shores of Botany Bay, the La Perouse peninsula, has a very special association for the French community in Australia and French people overseas as it was the last landfall of the noted French explorer, Jean-Francois Galaup de Lapérouse. The esteem the expedition is held in is marked by the Monument to Lapérouse commissioned in 1829 by the French and the annual ceremonies celebrating the visit of Lapérouse.

The place has potential to yield information that will contribute to an understanding of the cultural or natural history of New South Wales.

The place is of state significance as a place of important technical achievement with the collecting efforts of Banks and Solander who during their visit in 1770 made the first important collection of fauna and flora from Australia. The Banks and Solander collection included many items that had never before been described and classified. The publication of Banks' Florilegium, a full colour edition which included illustrations and descriptions of the entire collection from the voyage in 1770, was the culmination of Banks's and Solander's work.

Previous archaeological excavations indicate that Kamay Botany Bay National Park and Towra Point Nature Reserve have significance for their high level of archaeological potential.

The La Perouse headland is significant as the place where the crew of Lapérouse's expedition of exploration made camp was where Joseph Lapaute Dagelet set up his observatory and made the first astronomical observations in Australia.

The place possesses uncommon, rare or endangered aspects of the cultural or natural history of New South Wales.

Kamay Botany Bay National Park is where British colonisers first stepped ashore in Eastern Australia, and it is the meeting place of Indigenous and white colonial Australia.

Kamay Botany Bay National Park and the Towra Point Nature Reserve wetlands contain rare remnant vegetation and fauna communities threatened and endangered species and vegetation communities such as: the Eastern Suburbs Banksia Scrub community, the littoral rainforest and Kurnell dune forest, a vast array of threatened and endangered bird species such as the little tern, frogs such as the green and gold bell frog and mammals like the grey headed flying fox. The park is an important link in the network of parks and reserves in NSW and plays an important role in conserving the biodiversity of the state.

The place is important in demonstrating the principal characteristics of a class of cultural or natural places/environments in New South Wales.

Kamay Botany Bay National Park contains evidence of the intensive occupation by Indigenous people before the arrival and settlement by Europeans and is representative of the pre-contact Indigenous cultural landscape.

The remnant vegetation communities of Towra Point Nature Reserve and Kamay Botany Bay National Park are representative of the original vegetation communities which would have been evident from Sydney Cove to Port Hacking.

Kamay Botany Bay National Park is a representative example of a site with an extensive grouping of memorials commemorating highly significant historic events: the historic meeting of Indigenous and British cultures, the exploration of Captain James Cook, the important scientific collection work undertaken on the site by Banks and Solander, the noted French explorer Comte de Lapérouse and his party.

Towra Point Nature Reserve and Kamay Botany Bay National Park represent the role of parks and reserves in the conservation of biodiversity.

== See also ==
- Bare Island
- New South Wales Golf Club
- Protected areas of New South Wales
