= Cape Solander =

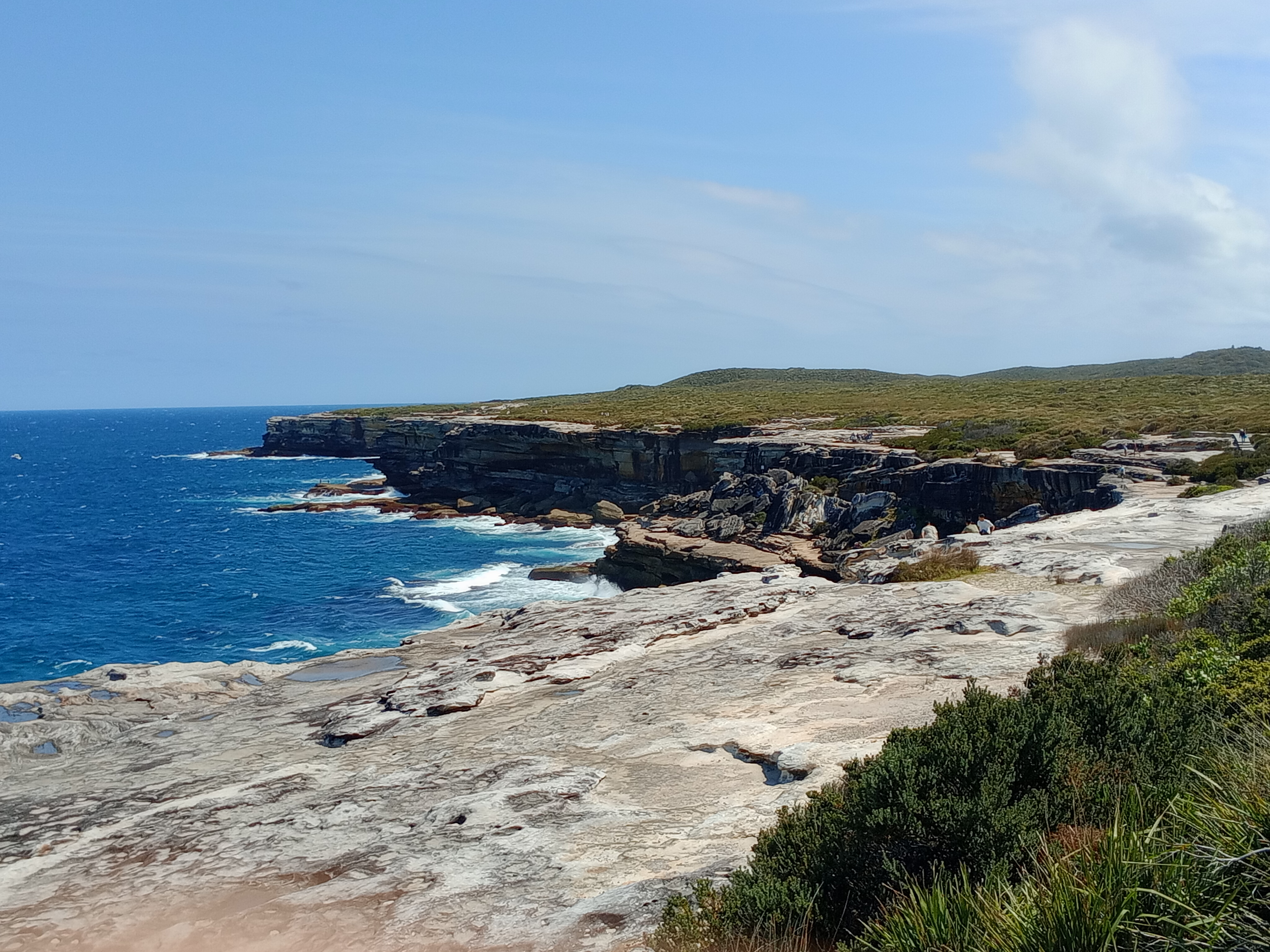
- Cape Solander pictured in January 2026
- Interactive map of Cape Solander
- 34°00′59″S 151°13′54″E
- Location: Sydney, New South Wales
- Nearest city: Kurnell

Site notes
- Owner: NSW National Parks & Wildlife Service
- Website: https://www.nationalparks.nsw.gov.au/things-to-do/lookouts/cape-solander

Cape Solander is a natural tourist attraction located near the town of Kurnell, New South Wales, Australia, situated in the Kamay Botany Bay National Park. A whale watching destination, the cape is also a nature preserve for Australian native plant species.

Multiple fatalities caused by falling from the cliffs have occurred at this location.

== Overview ==
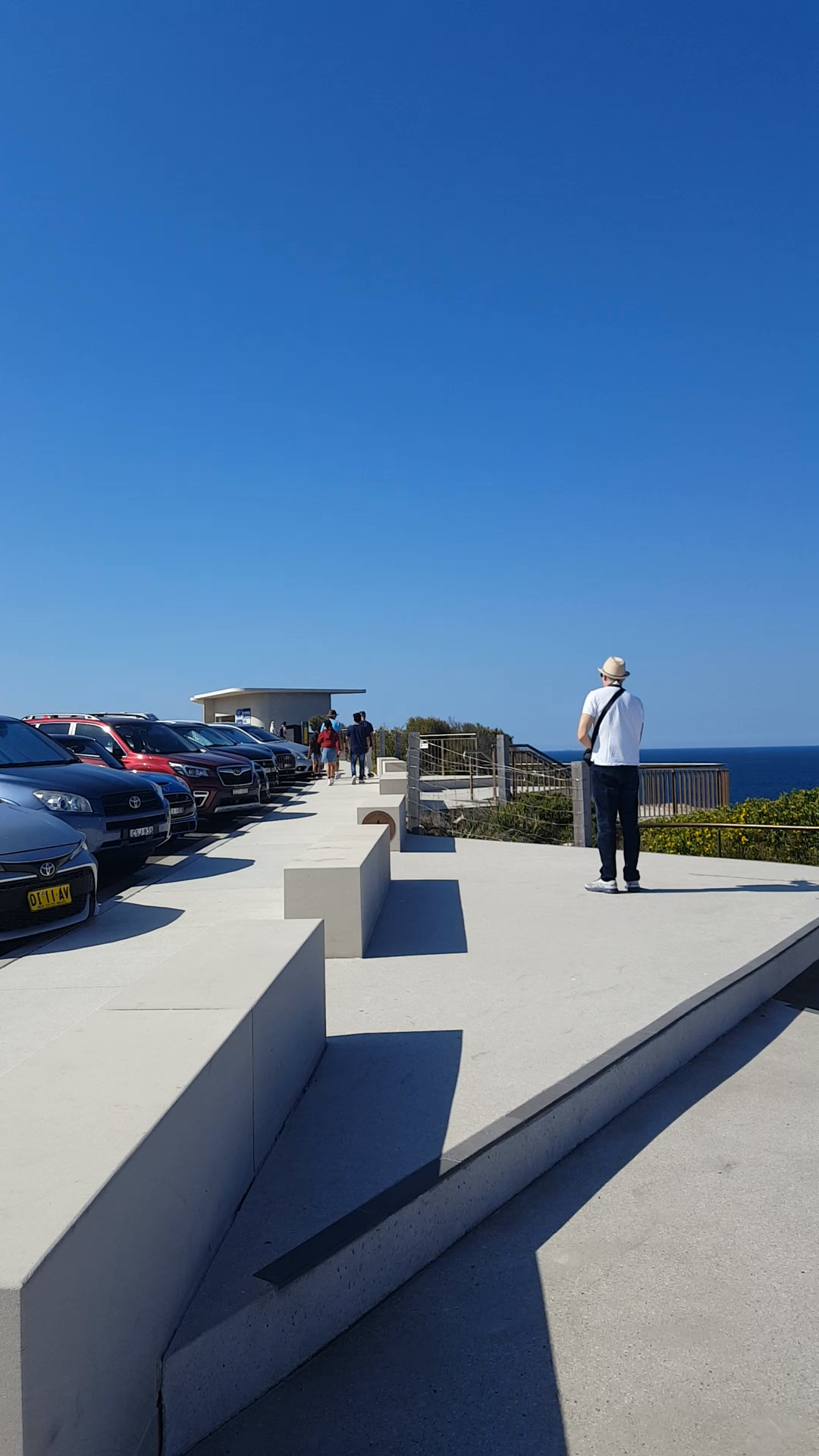
Cape Solander's whale-watching platform and car park

Cape Solander is located on the Kurnell Peninsula, on the southern side of the Kamay Botany Bay National Park. The cape was named after Swedish botanist Daniel Solander who landed with Captain James Cook at Kurnell near the cape's location. It marks the start of the Cape Baily Walking Track, that leads to the Cape Baily Lighthouse. Around the cape, there are several other landmarks such as Tabbigai Gap, Blue Hole Gorge, and Yena Track. Cape Solander is a place for whale-watching with 300,000 tourists coming from all around the world for this activity.

== Aboriginal heritage ==
Cape Solander is on Gweagal and Goorawal traditional Aboriginal land. These were the same clans that Captain Cook encountered on his declaration of terra nulius in 1770.

== Description ==
The white rocks that surround the cliffside of Cape Solander, are Hawkesbury Sandstone, which are commonly occurring in the Sydney area. At the parking area, there is a whale-watching platform for tourists to use when whales migrate in winter, which the New South Wales Government built for 2.5 million dollars.

== Accidents ==
=== 2018 ===
In 2018, an American Mormon missionary slipped and fell to his death while posing for a selfie at the cliffs.

=== 2024 ===
In June of 2024, two women died when they were swept off the rocks near Cape Solander while walking. A third woman managed to climb onto the rocks to safety.

== See also ==
- Kamay Botany Bay National Park
- Kurnell
- La Perouse
- Bare Island
