= Coastal defences of Australia during World War II =

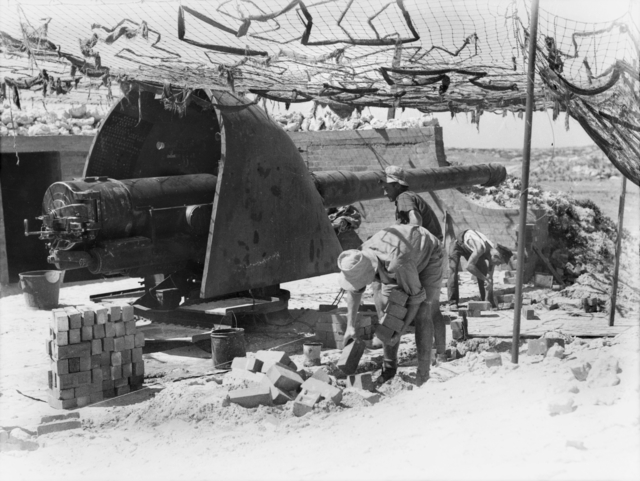
Leighton Battery in Fremantle, Western Australia in 1943

The following is a list of coastal batteries in Australia and its territories during World War II. The main threat came early in the war from German raiders and threat of Japanese raids or invasion, and hence all available ordnance was pressed into service, including some obsolete guns and field guns adapted for coast defence.

== New South Wales ==
=== Newcastle ===
- Park Battery, The Hill – 2 × 6 in Mk VII guns
- Scratchley Battery, Newcastle East – 2 × 6 in Mk VII guns and 1 × 6-pdr 10 cwt gun
- Wallace Battery, Stockton – 2 × 9.2 in Mk X guns

=== Port Kembla ===
Media related to Kembla Fortress at Wikimedia Commons

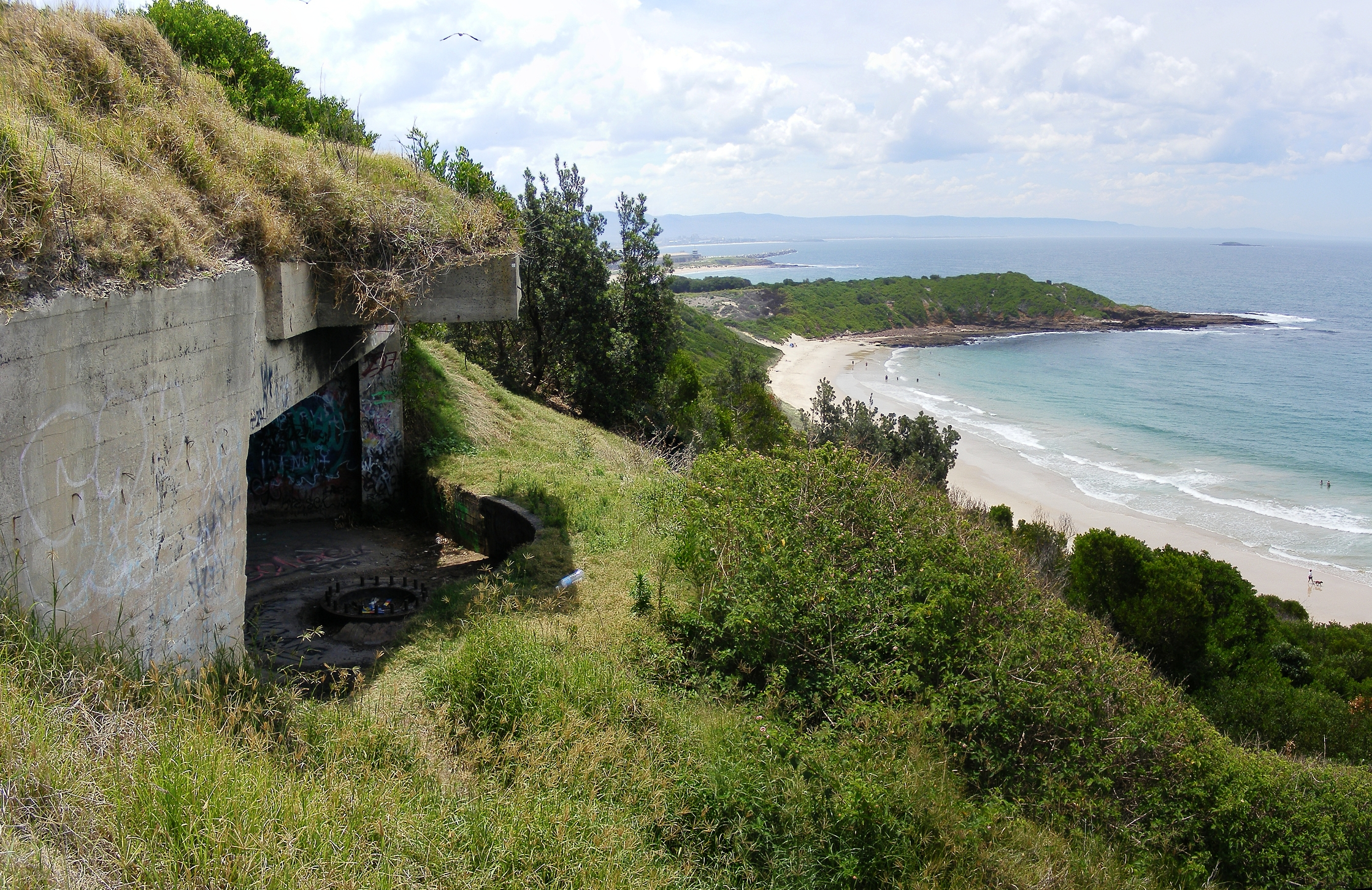
Illowra Battery, Port Kembla, New South Wales

- Breakwater Battery, Port Kembla – 2 × 6 in Mk XI guns
- Drummond Battery, Coniston – 2 × 9.2 in Mk X guns
- Illowra Battery, Port Kembla – 2 × 6 in Mk XI guns

=== Port Stephens ===
- Tomaree Battery, Shoal Bay – 2 × 6 in Mk VII guns

=== Sydney ===
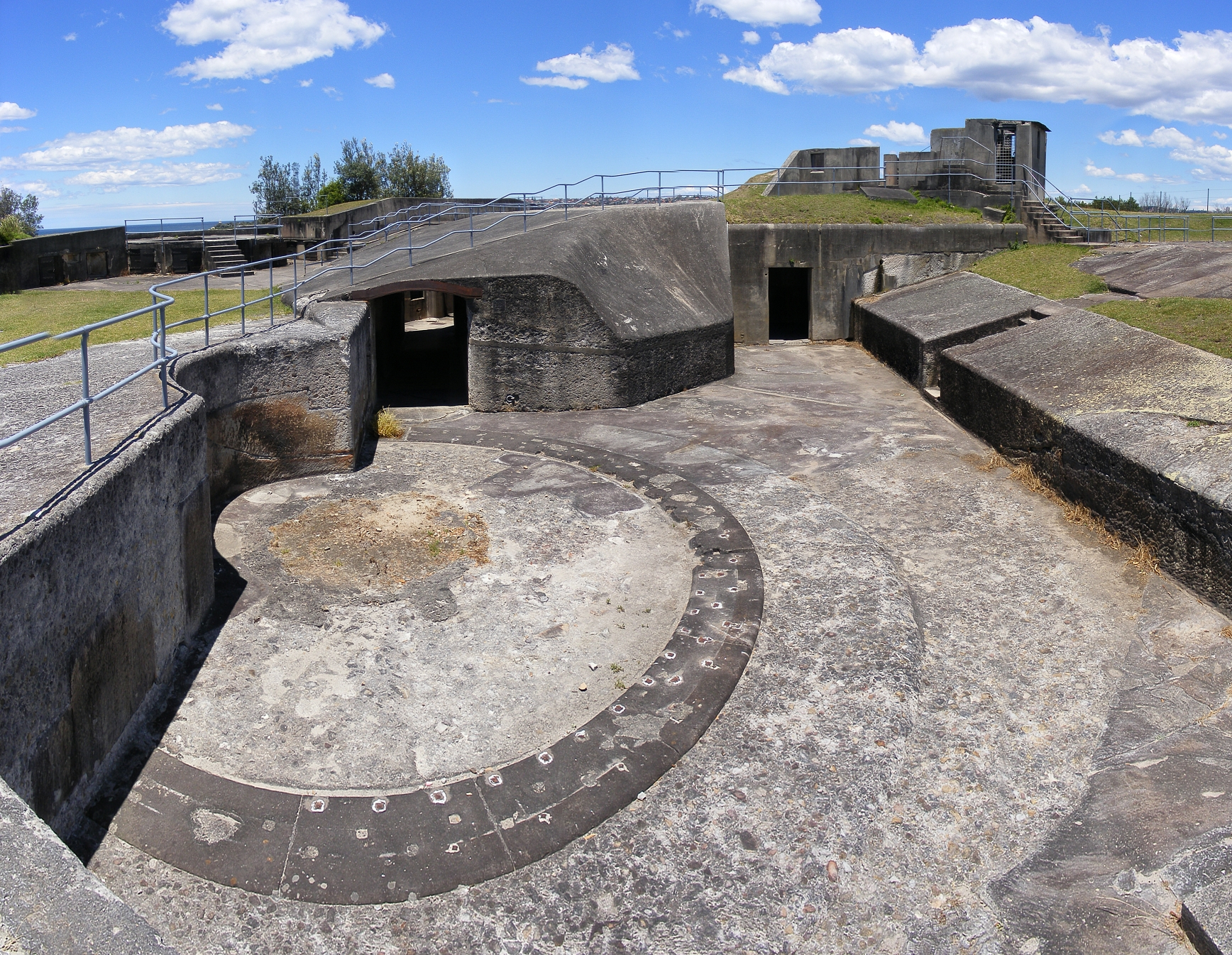
Middle Head Fortifications, Sydney Harbour

- Banks Battery, North of Cape Banks, La Perouse – 2 × 9.2 in Mk X guns
- Casemate Battery, Middle Head – 2 × 6-pdr 10 cwt guns
- Henry Battery, Henry Head, La Perouse – 2 × 18-pdr Mk IV guns
- Hornby Battery, South Head – 2 × 6 in Mk VII guns
- Malabar Battery, Malabar Headland, Malabar – 2 × 6 in Mk XII guns
- Middle Head Fortifications, Middle Head – 2 × 6 in Mk VII guns, 1 × QF 12-pounder gun
- North Battery, North Head – 2 × 9.2 in Mk X guns
- Shelly Battery, Shelly Head, Manly – 1 × 12-pdr 12 cwt gun
- Signal Battery, South Head – 2 × 6 in Mk XI guns
- West Battery, West Head – 2 × 4.7 in guns

Note: A 6-pdr 10 cwt battery was under construction.

== Northern Territory ==
- Dudley Battery, Darwin – 2 × 4 in Mk VII guns and 1 × 6-pdr 10 cwt gun
- East Battery, Darwin – 2 × 9.2 in Mk X guns, 2 × 6 in Mk XI guns
- Emery Battery, Darwin – 2 × 6 in Mk XI guns
- Waugite Battery, Darwin – 2 × 6 in Mk XI guns
- Elliot Section – 1 × 6-pdr 10 cwt gun
- West Point Section, Darwin – 1 × 6-pdr 10 cwt gun

== Papua New Guinea ==
=== Lae ===
- U Battery – 4 × 155 mm guns

=== Port Moresby ===
- Paga Battery – 2 × 6 in Mk XI guns, 2 6-pdr 10 cwt guns
- Boera Battery – 2 (?) × 155 mm guns

=== Rabaul ===
- Praed Point Battery – 2 × 6 in Mk VII guns

== Queensland ==
=== Brisbane ===
- Bribie Battery, Bribie Island – 2 × 6 in Mk XI guns
- Skirmish Battery, Bribie Island – 2 × 155 mm guns
- Cowan Battery, Moreton Island – 2 × 6 in Mk XI guns
- Rous Battery, Moreton Island – 2 × 155 mm guns
- Lytton Battery, Lytton – 1 × 4.7 in gun

=== Cairns ===
- False Cape Battery, East Trinity – 2 × 155 mm guns

=== Torres Strait ===
- Endeavour Battery – 2 × 6 in Mk XI guns
- Goods Battery – 2 × 6 in Mk XI guns
- Kings Battery – 2 × 18-pdr Mk IV guns
- Milman Battery, Thursday Island – 1 × 4.7 in gun
- Turtle Battery – 2 × 155 mm guns

=== Townsville ===
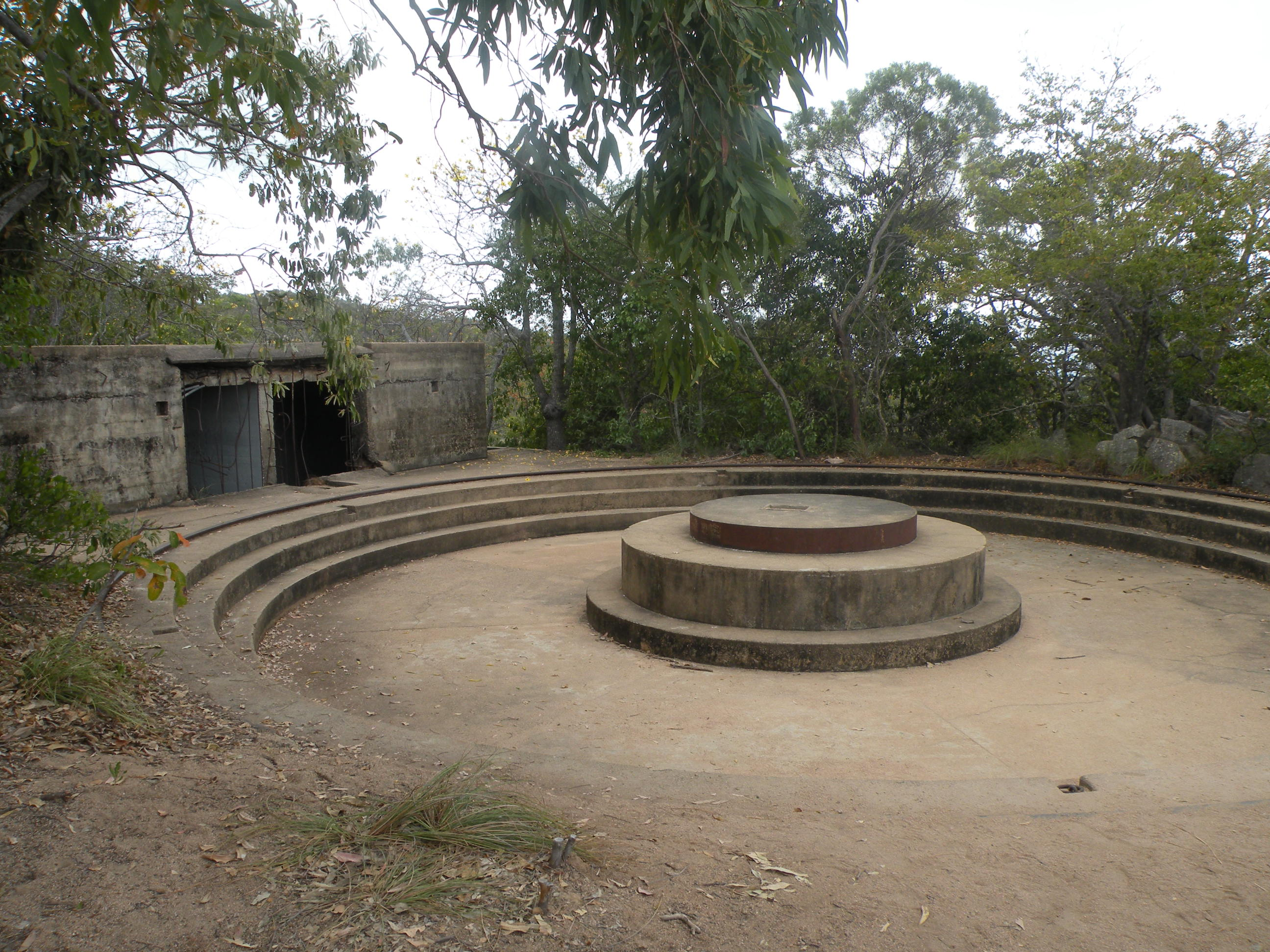
155 mm coastal defence gun emplacement at Magnetic Island, Townsville

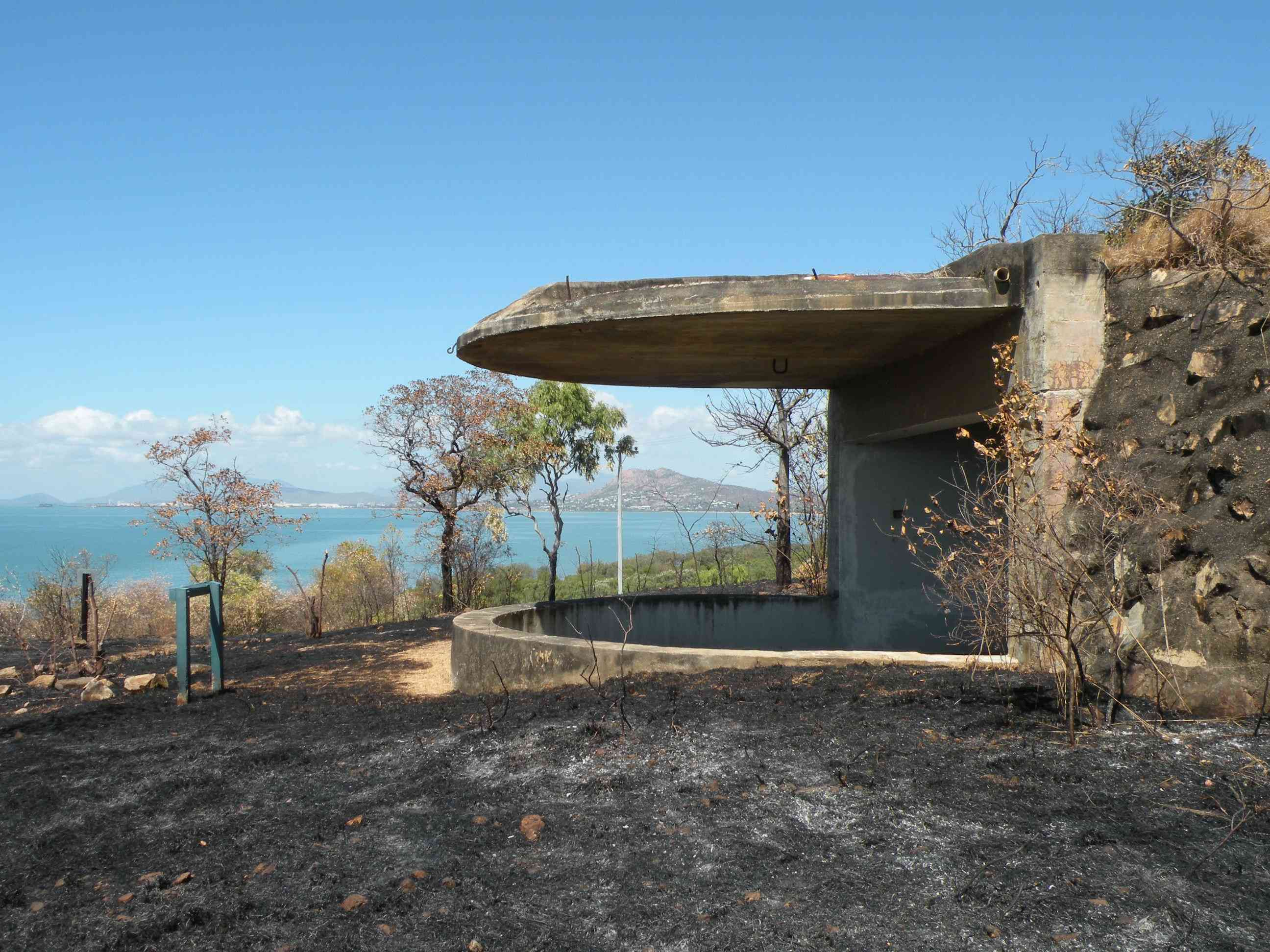
One of two 4.7 inch coastal defence gun emplacements built at Cape Pallarenda, Townsville in 1943

- Magazine Battery, South Townsville – 2 × 155 mm guns
- Kissing Point Battery, North Ward – 2 × 6 in Mk VII guns
- Magnetic Battery, Magnetic Island – 2 × 155 mm guns
- Cape Pallarenda Battery, Pallarenda – 2 × 4.7 in Mk IV guns

== South Australia ==
- Fort Largs, Taperoo – 2 × 6 in Mk VII guns
- Hummock Hill Battery, Whyalla – 4 × 3.7 in Mk II or III AA guns

== Tasmania ==
- Direction Battery, Hobart – 2 × 6 in Mk VII guns
- Pierson Battery, Hobart – 1 × 6 in Mk VII gun

== Victoria ==
- Cribb Battery, Port Phillip – 1 × 6 in Mk VII gun
- Crow's Nest Battery, Queenscliff – 2 × 4.7 in guns and 1 × 14-pdr gun
- Lonsdale Battery, Point Lonsdale – 2 × 6 in Mk VII guns
- Nepean Battery, Point Nepean – 2 × 6 in Mk VII guns
- Pearce Battery, Point Nepean – 2 × 6 in Mk VII guns

== Western Australia ==
=== Albany ===
- Princess Battery, Albany – 2 × 6 in guns

=== Fremantle ===
Media related to Fremantle Fortress at Wikimedia Commons

- Harbour Battery, Fremantle – 2 × 6-pdr 10 cwt, 2 × 18-pdr Mk IV guns
- Leighton Battery, Fremantle – 2 × 6 in Mk VII guns
- Swanbourne Battery, Fremantle – 2 × 6 in Mk VII guns

Note: A 9.2 in Mk Xv battery was under construction.

=== Garden Island (Cockburn Sound) ===
- Beacon Battery, Garden Island – 2 × 4 in ex-US naval guns
- Challenger Battery, Garden Island – 2 × 155 mm guns
- Collie Battery, Garden Island – 2 × 12-pdr 12 cwt guns

=== Geraldton ===
- Geraldton Battery, Geraldton – 2 × 4 in ex-US naval guns, 2 × 18-pdr Mk IV guns

=== Rockingham ===
- Peron Battery, Cape Peron – 2 × 155 mm, 2 × 18-pdr Mk IV guns

=== Rottnest Island ===
- Bickley Battery, Rottnest Island – 2 × 6 in Mk XI guns
- Oliver's Battery, Rottnest Island – 2 × 9.2 in Mk X guns

== See also ==
- Military history of Australia
- Structure of the Australian Army during World War II
- Anti-aircraft defences of Australia during World War II
- Hobart coastal defences
- Sydney Harbour defences
