= Shelly Battery =

Coordinates: 33.799°S 151.298°E

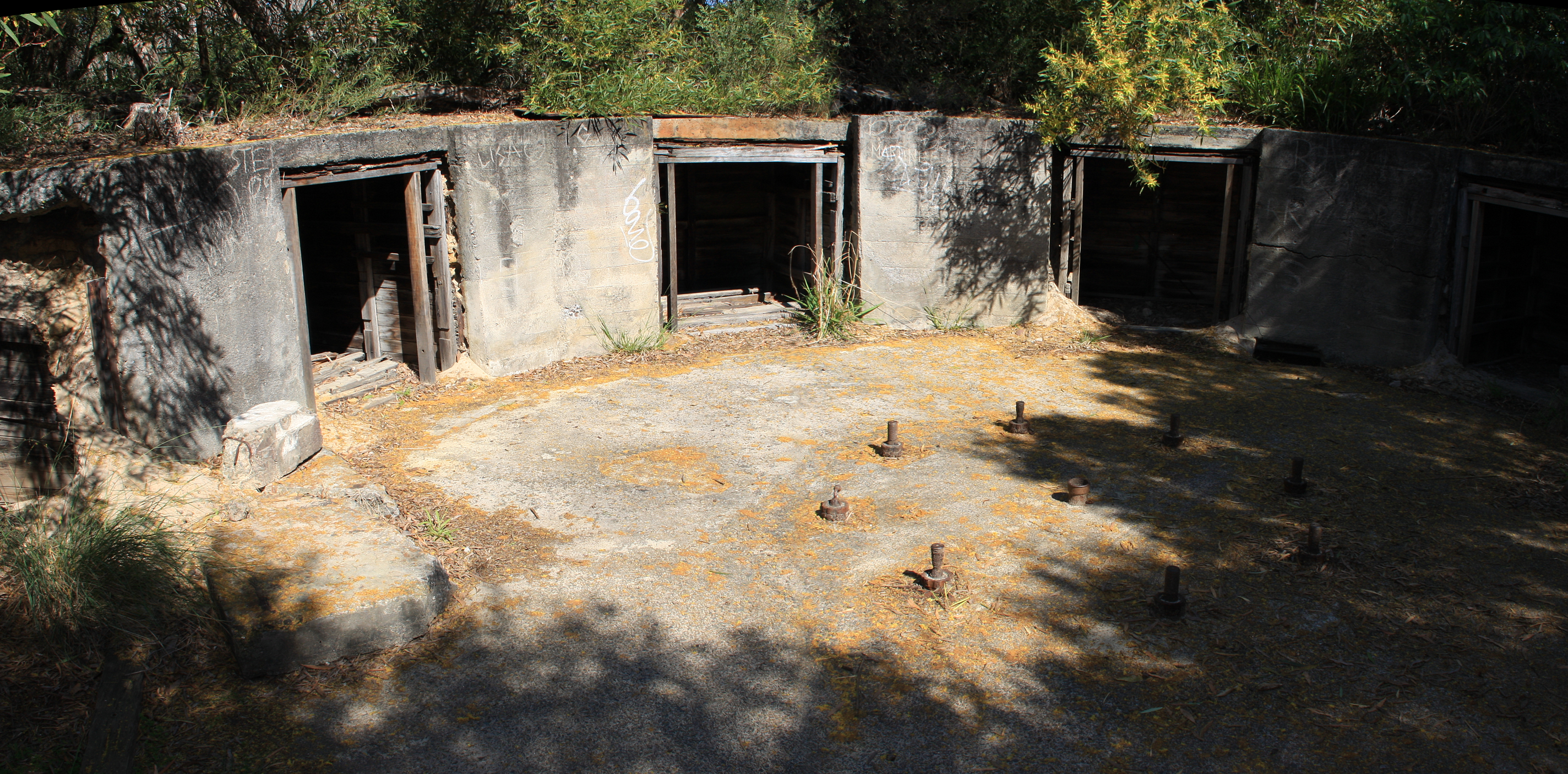
Shelly Battery gun emplacement in 2009.

Shelly Battery was a coastal battery located at Shelly Head, Manly, Sydney, New South Wales, Australia. The battery was constructed in 1942 during the Second World War and consisted of 1 x QF 12 pounder gun and a command post.

== See also ==
- Coastal defences of Australia during World War II
- Military history of Australia
