= Fairy Bower =

Fairy Bower may refer to the following places in Australia:

- Fairy Bower, Queensland, a suburb of Rockhampton
- Fairy Bower Beach, a beach in Manly, Sydney, New South Wales
