= Shepherds Hill military installations =

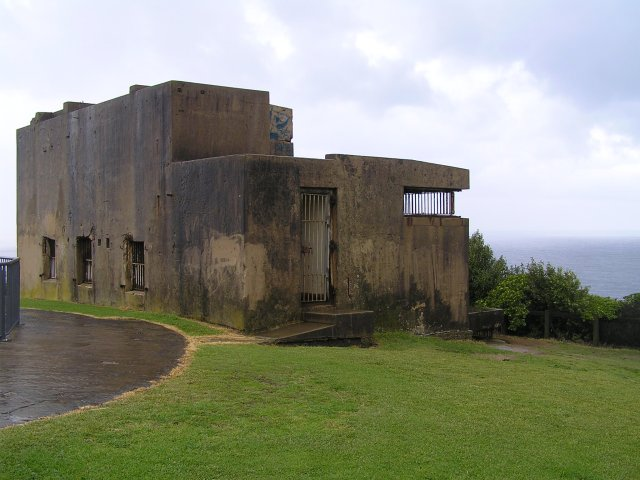
- Part of Shepherds Hill Defence Group Military Installations

- Location within New South Wales Location within Australia
- 32.9357°S 151.7787°E
- Location: 41 The Terrace, Newcastle, City of Newcastle, New South Wales, Australia

History
- Built: 1890–1940

Site notes
- Owner: Land and Property Management Authority (LPMA); Newcastle City Council

New South Wales Heritage Register
- Official name: Shepherds Hill Defence Group Military Installations; Shepherds Hill Group includes Residence (Gunner's Cottage/Caretaker's quarters); Observation Post and Gun Placement; Shepherds Hill Battery
- Type: state heritage (complex / group)
- Designated: 2 July 2010
- Reference no.: 1806
- Type: Fortification
- Category: Defence

The Shepherds Hill military installations is a New South Wales state heritage-listed site, consisting of a former military gun battery emplacement, observation post and gunner's cottage at The Terrace in Newcastle, New South Wales, Australia. It was built from 1890 to 1940. It is also known as Shepherds Hill Defence Group Military Installations, Observation Post and Gun Placement and Shepherds Hill Battery. It was added to the New South Wales State Heritage Register on 2 July 2010.

== History ==
The name 'Shepherds Hill' is derived from the name "Sheep Pasture Hills" which was given to the place by Lieutenant Colonel William Paterson when he first visited the site in 1801, because the steep grassy slopes reminded him of England. The area was mined for coal during the 1840s, with a copper smelting works operating on the site. Huts were constructed for miners and their families.

In 1879, Colonel Scratchley proposed a self-contained and self-defensible fort with the purpose of protecting the settlement as well as the Newcastle coalfields from foreign attack.

Military occupation of the site began in the 1890s, with the construction of an 8-inch disappearing gun emplacement with underground rooms. This was developed in response the threat of an attack from Russia. A cottage was also built, and this was first inhabited by Master Gunner Wollitt, when he was master to the gunner for the Shepherds Hill and Fort Scratchley emplacement. There were two batteries in operation at Shepherds Hill, one to the south of the site near Cliff Street and one to the north, above York Drive. The second battery has since been demolished. These two batteries were established as part of an integrated project to advance the defences of the city of Newcastle. This project included the strengthening of fortifications at Fort Scratchley.

In 1896 a gun was constructed at Shepherds Hill, one mile south of Fort Scratchley, in order to strengthen Newcastle's defence system. The disappearing gun, also known as a "jumper" or "hydro-pneumatic gun" had been developed in 1883 and seemed to offer cheap, effective protection with the benefit of being discreet. Major General Scratchley ordered many of these new guns for the Australian colonies, despite the reservations that the War Office had about the guns. The gun was supported above the gun pit by a carriage and after firing, the gun would contract down below the parapet to be reloaded. The energy of this contraction was absorbed in compressing hydraulic rams which then returned the gun to firing position.

However, this weapon had two significant drawbacks. Firstly, it only offered limited elevation and secondly, the time taken to reload the gun was a hindrance. The new warships that had been developed demanded a faster rate of fire which could only be achieved by a gun which stayed in position and could be simultaneously fired and loaded.

The British Government discontinued this system of defence in Australian colonies after a few years. In 1906, the Shepherds Hill gun was deemed unsafe, and this, in combination with the fact that Fort Scratchley did not have a clear view of Stockton Bight led to the establishment of Fort Wallace at Stockton.

By 1939, Newcastle was one of the primary sources of munitions production for NSW and during World War II it became a significant industrial area. The company BHP, which operated in Newcastle, had been preparing for the outbreak of war since Essington Lewis, its head had made an overseas trip in 1934. Munitions productions began at the steelworks and metallurgists were forced to adapt new technologies involved in manufacturing alloys not previously produced in Australia. After acquiring the steelworks at Port Kembla, BHP became the only integrated iron and steel producer in Australia.

Thus, the defence of Newcastle had an importance beyond the immediate area and was significant to Australia as a whole. The majority of the state's shells were produced in Newcastle and it was also the site of the NSW Dockyards. In order to protect these productions, a new system of defence was undertaken, which included the strengthening of Fort Wallace at Stockton and construction of two new close defence batteries, Shepherds Hill and Fort Scratchley. Both sites were armed with 6 inch MK VII ex naval guns and controlled from an Observation Post on the site of the old 8 inch battery on Shepherds Hill. All defences in area were controlled by the Observation Post on Shepherds Hill.

As part of the strengthening of Newcastle's defence system, various new projects were undertaken at Shepherds Hill during WWII, such as accommodation for troops stationed on site and erection of the No's 1 and 2 searchlights and engine rooms and driving a 100 metre long tunnel to provide a housing for the No. 1 searchlight, 60 metres above sea level. The cottage was used as an Officers Mess for troops stationed at Shepherds Hill.

The most important construction was that of an Observation Post. The natural height of the hill as well as the ruggedness of the hills made Shepherds Hill a good location for this construction. The Observation Post was 106m above sea level and was used as a range finder for Fort Wallace, which had an Observation Post only 22m above sea level. This was unusual because it meant that the post was 6000 yards away from the guns that it controlled, but the extra height of Shepherds Hill was necessary in order to have a clear view of targets. New technologies in instant communication via electric telegraph made this possible.

During WWII the Observation Port was simultaneously run by all three services; the Royal Australian Navy, the Army and the Royal Australian Air Force. The Port War Signal Station was controlled by the Navy and used to collect information on ship movements. The Early warning radar was manned by the Air Force. Those functions manned by the Navy were the Fire Commander's Post, Officer Commanding Searchlights, a Fortress Observation Post, a Battery Observation Post for Fort Wallace as well as one for Park Battery and a searchlight direction station for Park Battery.

The development of the Observation Post at Shepherds Hill during WW II reflects Australia's growing fear of invasion. One of the reasons for this concern was the realisation that Australia could not rely as heavily on Britain for protection as it had in the past. There seemed a real threat of a Japanese invasion, especially since the League of Nations mandate, which allowed Japan to administer various Islands in the Pacific Ocean. Thus, defence of the coast was a priority. Fort Scratchley, which had close ties to Shepherds Hill, responded to an attack on the city by a Japanese submarine in June 1942. This is the only place on the mainland of Australia known to have returned fire. The batteries at Shepherds Hill formed an integrated system with the batteries at Fort Scratchley, Fort Wallace at Stockton and at Tomaree on Port Stephens. Shepherds Hill had the role of coordinating this system.

In 1946, a policy of classifying Australia's defences in three different categories was adopted. Newcastle's defences were classified as category "B", which meant that they were to be kept fully operational and stored in such a way that they could be quickly installed in the appropriate location during wartime. The only other city in NSW classified as "B" was Sydney.

In 1956, following orders from the British Government, Coast Artillery was disbanded. In the 1950s to early 1960s, the Gunner's Cottage at Shepherds Hill was inhabited by Jack Green, the Officer Commanding the School Cadets. It was used by the Army until the 1960s. Following this, it housed Newcastle city's "Artist in Residence", as part of a program aimed towards promoting young local artists.

Between 1988 and 1992 Tony Steinbeck lived in the Gunner's Cottage.

The land is now held by the State Government's Department of Lands, with Newcastle City Council appointed as Trustee. The cottage has been renovated and is now used by the Newcastle branch of the Volunteer Coastal Patrol.

Along with Fort Scratchley and South Head in Sydney, Shepherds Hill is one of the few sites in NSW where fortifications are still intact. As with Shepherds Hill, South Head is a natural defence point of the coast. South Head formed part of an integrated system of defence of the Sydney coast line with other sites of strategic importance being Middle Head and North Head. The remaining fortifications at South Head are illustrative of an open system of defence. Open batteries were cheaper to construct than closed batteries or casemates and were also effective against new warfare technologies such as explosive shells. This system of defence was implemented at South Head during the 1870s. Although South Head, North Head and Middle did have disappearing guns, these were replaced in the 1890s by Quick Firing Guns, which were in open concrete pits. In contrast, the system at Shepherds Hill is illustrative of a closed system of defence, with the disappearing gun and underground passages providing physical evidence of this system. Thus, if South Head and Shepherds Hill are looked at together, an archaeology of changing military technologies becomes apparent.

== Description and condition ==
The Shepherds Hill Group comprises:

- The Gunner's Cottage
- The remains of the disappearing gun;
- An observation post complex, and
- The remains of the No. 1 searchlight position, with its attached tunnel and engine room

The site is 70m above sea level and extends from the street called The Terrace, approximately 110m eastwards to the top of the cliff.

As at 17 November 2009, the grounds at Shepherds Hill are in reasonable condition in the central area. However towards the edges of the hill, Chrysanthemoides monilifera bushes proliferate and it has an unkempt appearance. Apart from the Gunner's Cottage, the items at Shepherds Hill have not been well maintained.

=== Gunner's Cottage ===
The Gunner's Cottage, known also as the Shepherds Hill Cottage or simply the Caretaker's Quarters, is an Edwardian period weatherboard residence with a corrugated metal roof and feature timber finials. The residence stands in contrasts to the brutalist concrete forms of the observation post structures. The cottage contains a living room, a dining room, three bedrooms, two sunrooms, a kitchen, a bathroom, a laundry and a porch. The garage, store and toilet are detached from the cottage. The sunrooms and the bathroom are additions, which is evident from the more contemporary style of windows. The garage is also an addition. The cottage was once used to house Newcastle's artist-in-residence.

Being restored by the NCC in 1997, a caretaking role has been taken up by the Royal Volunteer Coastal Patrol who carry out their operations from the building and hold a 20-year lease, which expires in 2018. As such, the cottage is kept reasonably well maintained. The laundry shed however suffers minor deterioration.

=== Observation post complex ===
The observation post complex is made of reinforced concrete and has five levels with eight observation rooms. It is approximately 8 meters tall and is an interesting structure due to its many interlocking levels. It is visible from many vantage points within the park and from the south and north along the coastline.

The structure is in poor condition and require considerable engineering and heritage conservation treatments to ensure it is preserved. As well as this, its lower level is filled with rubbish and regularly floods, and the salty air from the coast corrodes the embedded steel reinforcing which has led to large staining and fractures on the concrete outside. This corrosion has also occurred on areas of exposed steel.

=== Gun emplacement ===
The gun emplacement consists of a gun pit accompanied by two magazines, one for storing shells and the other for propellant charges. The emplacement can be accessed from a casemate via a vehicular ramp, in which includes a central corridor connected to two symmetrically placed depression range finder stations. There is another station which is above ground, standing north between the main building and the ramp.

Like above, the corridors leading to the gun pit are filled with rubbish, rubble and water. To various depths, the gun emplacement has been filled with sand and rubble. Despite the overall poor conditions, these tunnels are still visible as are the cables.

=== No. 1 searchlight position ===
The site of the former No. 1 searchlight is located on the cliff face nearly east of Strzelecki Lookout, in front of a block of houses. The searchlight was serviced by an engine room now located at nearby 65 Nesca Parade, connected via a brick and concrete-lined, approximately 100 metre long tunnel which housed its electrical cables. The engine room is of mass concrete construction and is visually similar to the construction of the observation post buildings. It is highly intact and the original steel entry doors survive, although a 2-storey residential flat building has been built on its roof. The tunnel has been sealed within at the beginning of the stairway, preventing access to Nesca Parade. There was also a second searchlight positioned to the left of the stepped pathway leading down to the lower end of Garside Gardens. Its engine house was at the foot of the slope immediately behind the bowling club. It has not been found as part of this study.

The tunnel remains structurally sound and the engine house is in good condition, albeit full of rubbish. The steel doors are heavily corroded, making access difficult. The strata unit manager has instructed that the doors be bolted and the windows are now clad in heavy ply to prevent unlawful entry. The cliff entry of the tunnel has been heavily vandalised, with the insides littered with aerosol cans and concrete rubble.

== Heritage listing ==
The Shepherds Hill Group is historically significant at a State and possibly a national level, because its history forms an important part of the story of Australian coastal defences, spanning a six-decade period from the late 19th, to the mid 20th century. During this time, the site was a key defence post. Its history provides an insight into the way that NSW defence policy reacted to changing technologies, threats and types of warfare. During WWII, the fortifications at Shepherds Hill played a co-ordinating role in the defence of Newcastle. Defence of Newcastle during this time was of high significance to the state, because Newcastle had become an area of great strategic and industrial importance in NSW, with its steelworks and operational port. The majority of the state's shells were produced in Newcastle and it was also the site of the NSW Dockyards. In order to protect these productions, a new system of defence was undertaken, which included the strengthening of Fort Wallis and the construction of two new close defence batteries - Shepherd's Hill and Fort Scratchley. The defence system proved its worth when in June 1942, Newcastle was fired on by cruising Japanese submarines, and Newcastle gained the distinction of being the only place in Australia that returned enemy fire with the launching of guns from Fort Scratchley. The fact that the Shepherds Hill fortification was simultaneously manned by members of the Navy, Army and the Air Force for a variety of functions is rare, and possibly unique in Australia.

Shepherds Hill military installations was listed on the New South Wales State Heritage Register on 2 July 2010 having satisfied the following criteria.

The place is important in demonstrating the course, or pattern, of cultural or natural history in New South Wales.

The Shepherds Hill Group is historically significant at a state level because of its importantrole in the coastal defence of NSW. It was an important defence and Observation post for the state during the time of the Crimean War. Shepherds Hill Group formed an integral part of Newcastle's integrated defence system, and changes made to this system since the 1880s reflect the way that NSW defence policy responded to new threats as well as technological developments. It was also crucial that Newcastle be defended during periods of war, due to the fact Newcastle was an important industrial centre, that supplied munitions from the steelworks and beef (via the port) to the military during WW2. The Newcastle Steelworks formed an important part of the economy of NSW and were a significant part of the war effort. The surviving complex tells an important story associated with the course of Australian national history and is strongly evocative of the military defence of strategically important Australian places.

The site has a significant association with all three of the armed forces. It is also associated with Fort Scratchley, another highly significant defence site and the only place on the mainland of Australia that is known to have returned fire. This occurred when the city was under attack by a Japanese submarine in June 1942.

The place is important in demonstrating aesthetic characteristics and/or a high degree of creative or technical achievement in New South Wales.

The place has strong or special association with a particular community or cultural group in New South Wales for social, cultural or spiritual reasons.

The Shepherds Hill group may be of social significance to the local veteran community.

The place has potential to yield information that will contribute to an understanding of the cultural or natural history of New South Wales.

The site is scientifically significant because the 8-inch Breach Loading Hydro Pneumatic Disappearing Gun emplacement in is an example of the developing technology during the latter years of the 19th Century. This has the potential to yield important information about changing military technologies in NSW. The No 1 Searchlight and tunnel retain a high degree of intactness. The structures have the potential to yield information relating to the construction techniques used at the time and the fortification of the coastline.

The place possesses uncommon, rare or endangered aspects of the cultural or natural history of New South Wales.

The site is rare as it contains the only unmodified 8-inch Disappearing Gun Emplacement in NSW. This gun emplacement provides a rare example of the disappearing guns that were a new and fleeting development in military technology. Although other sites such as South Head had disappearing guns, these were replaced in the 1890s. Shepherds Hill is possibly unique in Australia because during WWII, it was simultaneously manned by the R.A.N, Army and R.A.A.F for a variety of functions. The tunnel system appears to be intact and in good condition and it may be one of only a few such fortifications surviving under a headland in Australia, with the exception of Fort Scratchley. The No 1 Searchlight engine room and its 100 metre long tunnel are rare surviving examples of the fortification of the coastlineby the installation of a searchlight, high up on a sea cliff.

The place is important in demonstrating the principal characteristics of a class of cultural or natural places/environments in New South Wales.

Shepherds Hill is representative of the integrated coastal defence systems that was essential to the defence of NSW. Such an integrated system is also evident in the coastal defences of Sydney during the 19th and early to mid 20th centuries. Improvements in technologies allowed for both the Newcastle and Sydney coastal defence systems to communicate effectively.

== See also ==
- Disappearing gun
- Media related to Shepherds Hill military installations at Wikimedia Commons
