= The Corso, Manly =

Major pedestrian street in Manly, New South Wales

The Corso New South Wales
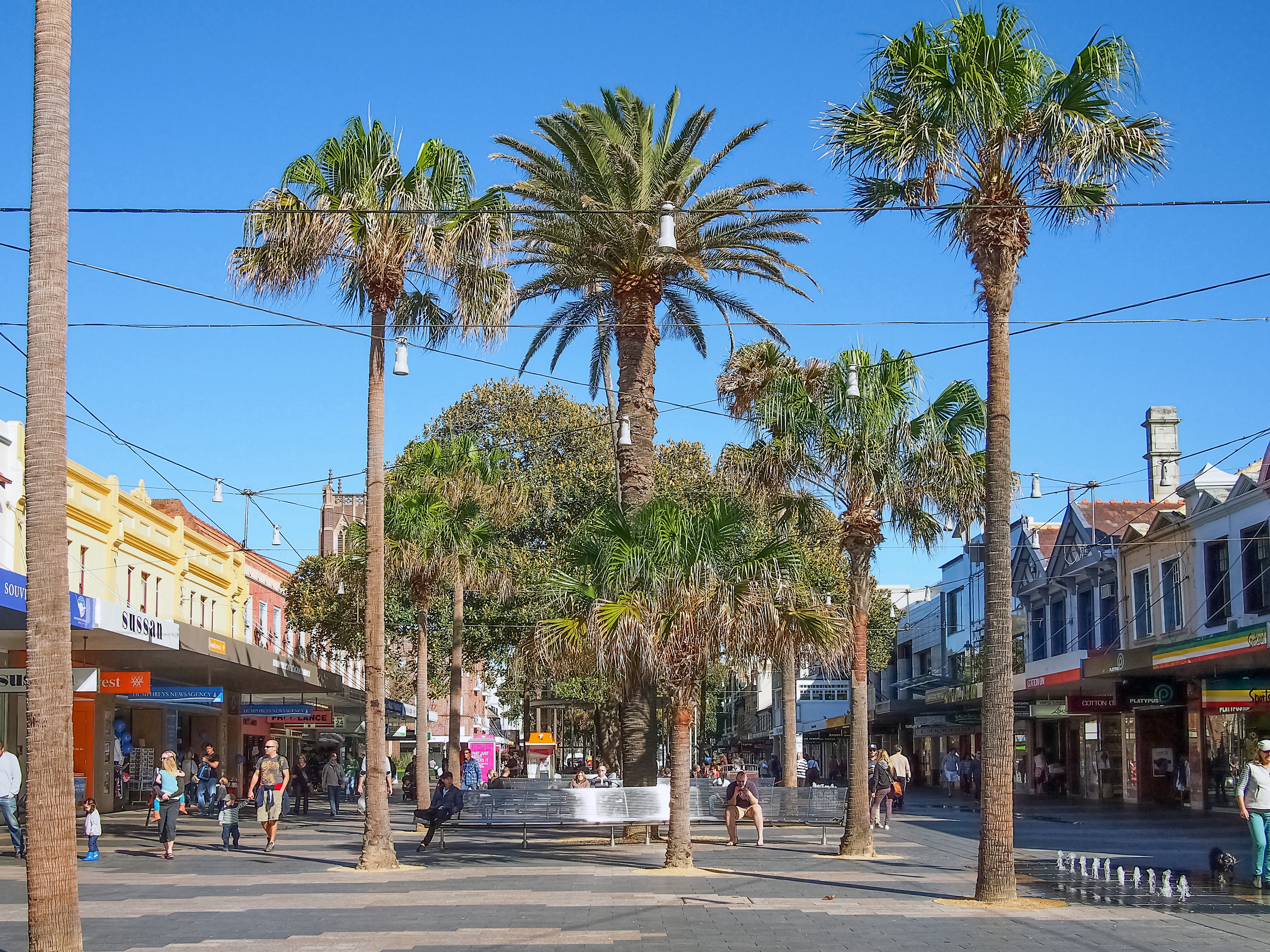
- The Corso, 2013
- Coordinates: 33.799150°S 151.284597°E (Southwest end); 33.797119°S 151.288060°E (Northeast end)

General information
- Type: Street
- Length: 450 m (0.3 mi)

Major junctions
- Southwest end: Belgrave Street; Manly, Sydney
- Northeast end: North Steyne; South Steyne; Manly, Sydney

The Corso is one of the main streets and a pedestrian mall in Manly, New South Wales, Australia. It connects the Manly ferry wharf to Manly Beach on the Pacific Ocean side of the Manly peninsula.

== History ==
There has long been a track between Manly Cove and Ocean Beach, worn by the local Aboriginal people, the Kay-ye-my clan of the Guringai people. Proposed by Henry Gilbert Smith, the earliest developer of Manly who had a vision for this stretch of ground as a promenade with hotels, tearooms and entertainment. The promenade was to be named after Via del Corso in Rome and it was to be the focal point of his planned new resort, called New Brighton or Manly Beach. The Corso was built in 1855 as a boardwalk, the street allowed tourists to cross the sand spit between the harbour pier and ocean beach. Realising that refreshment was essential, Smith established a hotel at each end of the Corso. The Pier was built in 1856 and the Steyne was built in 1858–59 which was designed by the colonial architect Edmund Blacket as well as St Matthew's Anglican Church halfway along the Corso which was built in 1865 and partly paid for by Smith. By 1861 there were three hotels and a temperance hotel, which only sold soft drinks. Twenty years later there were six hotels, three of which survive today.

In the 1880s most commercial activities were centred on the Corso with many families living above their businesses. Entertainment was added including an Aquarium and later, 'Sovereign' Smith's Gallery of Amusements. The first large general store White Brothers opened in 1907 and later became Campbell's General Merchants, a Corso landmark for many years.

By the 1920s the Corso was the main shopping precinct of the Northern Beaches. The Rialto Theatre opened on 23 July 1923 and was renamed to Odeon on 3 March 1951 operated until its closure on 28 January 1961. St Matthew's church along with the Victoria Hall next door was demolished in 1929 to make way the widening of the Corso. The new St Matthew's opened on 20 September 1930.

During the 1950s, The Corso was anchored by Woolworths, Coles, Campbell's, Cooper's, Little's, McIlrath's, Buckingham's, Snow's and HG Palmer's. In 1961 The Mall which was walk-through two-storey shopping centre opened on the site of the former Odeon and was renamed to La Gallerie in 1989.

With the opening of Warringah Mall, an American-style shopping centre in 1963 in the suburb of Brookvale saw The Corso shops declined. Many stores including Campbell's, Cooper's, Little's, McIlrath's, Buckingham's, Snow's, HG Palmer's and Woolworths closed. By 2008 only Coles remains as the sole anchor tenant. Surf brand Billabong and The Boardrider Backpacker opened in 2003 on the former site of Woolworths.

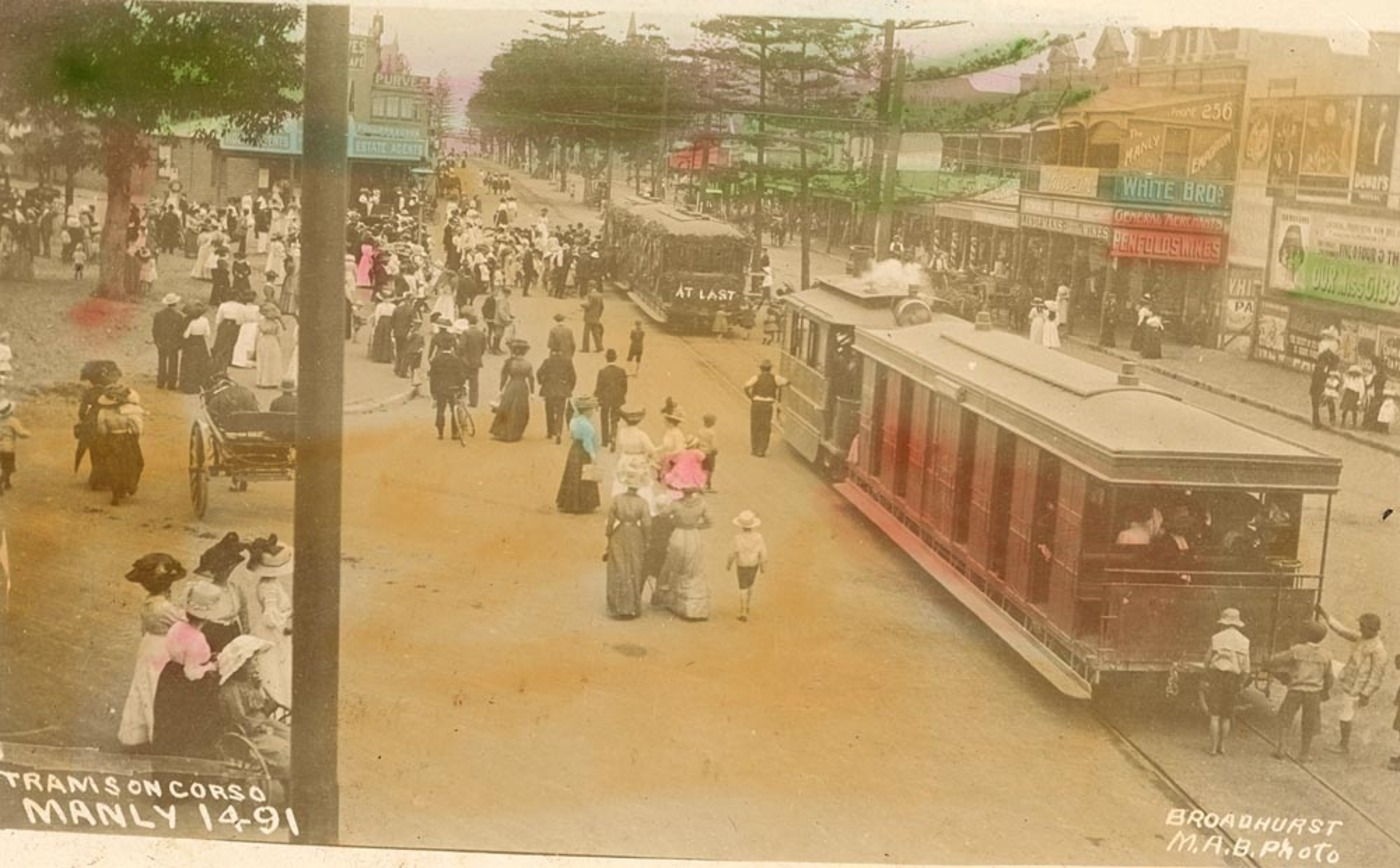
Trams on the Corso, early 20th Century

The Corso was partially returned to a pedestrian street in the 1970s. Its ocean-side intersection marks the boundary between the North Steyne and South Steyne sections of Manly Beach.

== Redevelopment ==
In 2007 Manly Council lodged an $8 million upgrade of The Corso. Vibrant lighting, water fountains, tree plantings, fresh new street furniture palettes, new tiles have been installed at The Corso. An open-air performance space ("Manly Corso Amphitheatre") has been removed during the renovations.

== Shopping centres ==
Three shopping centres and arcades are located on or close to The Corso:

- La Gallerie - Opened in 1961 as The Mall and renamed in 1989 as La Gallerie
- Henry Roth Arcade - Named after Henry Ling Roth
- Pacific Point Arcade - Located on Sydney Road near The Corso. Originally opened as a cinema called Britannia in 1916 renamed to New Olympic in honour of Boy Charlton, Dick Eve and Nick Winter, gold medallists in 1924 at the Paris Olympics. The building became into a furniture store in 1936. Waltons Ltd bought the site and opened their furniture and home appliances store on 3 December 1954. In the 1970s the building was converted into offices and an auction room with the shops and arcade linking Sydney Road with Henrietta Lane opened in 1983.

== Gallery ==
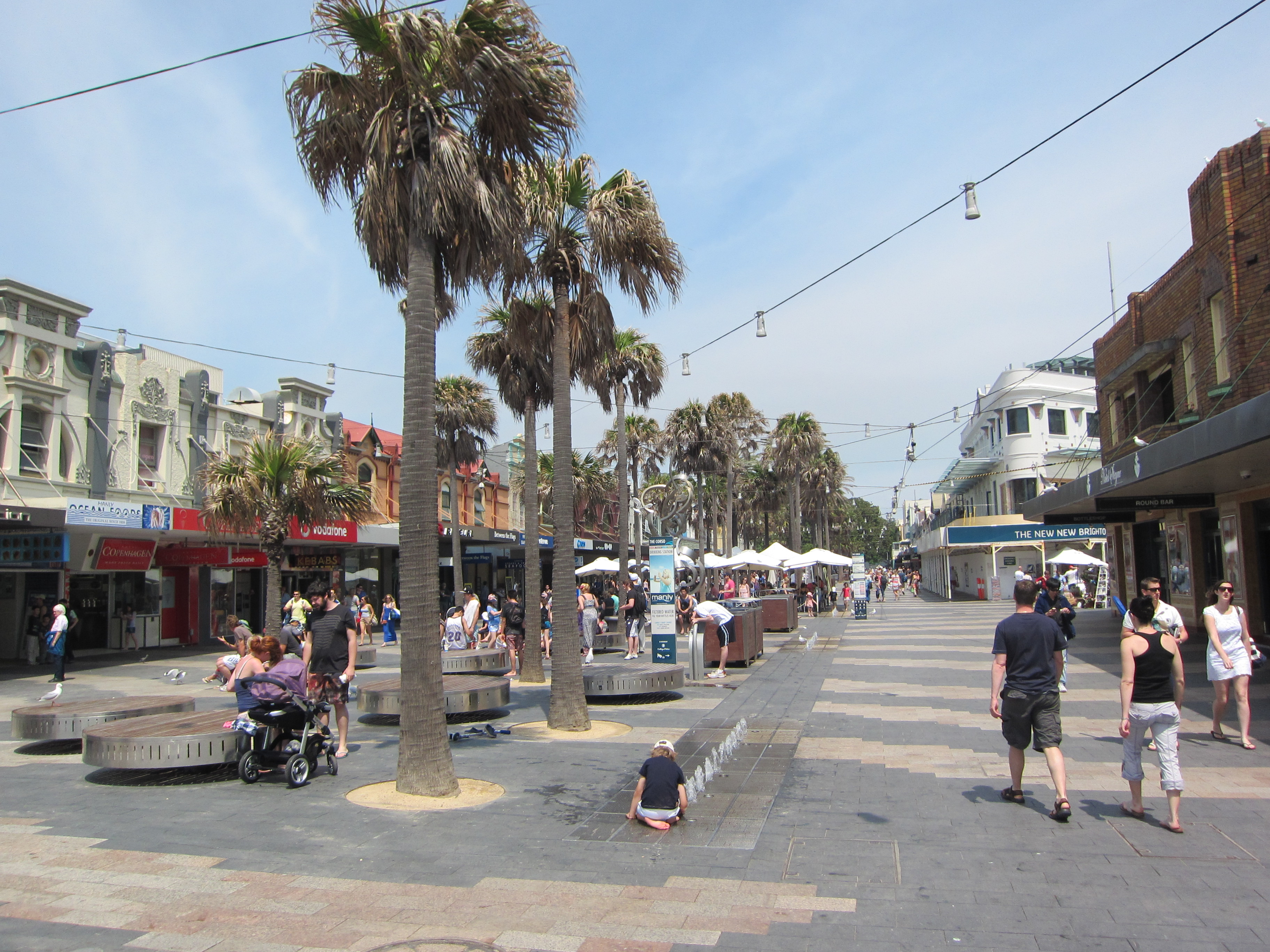
The Corso in 2011

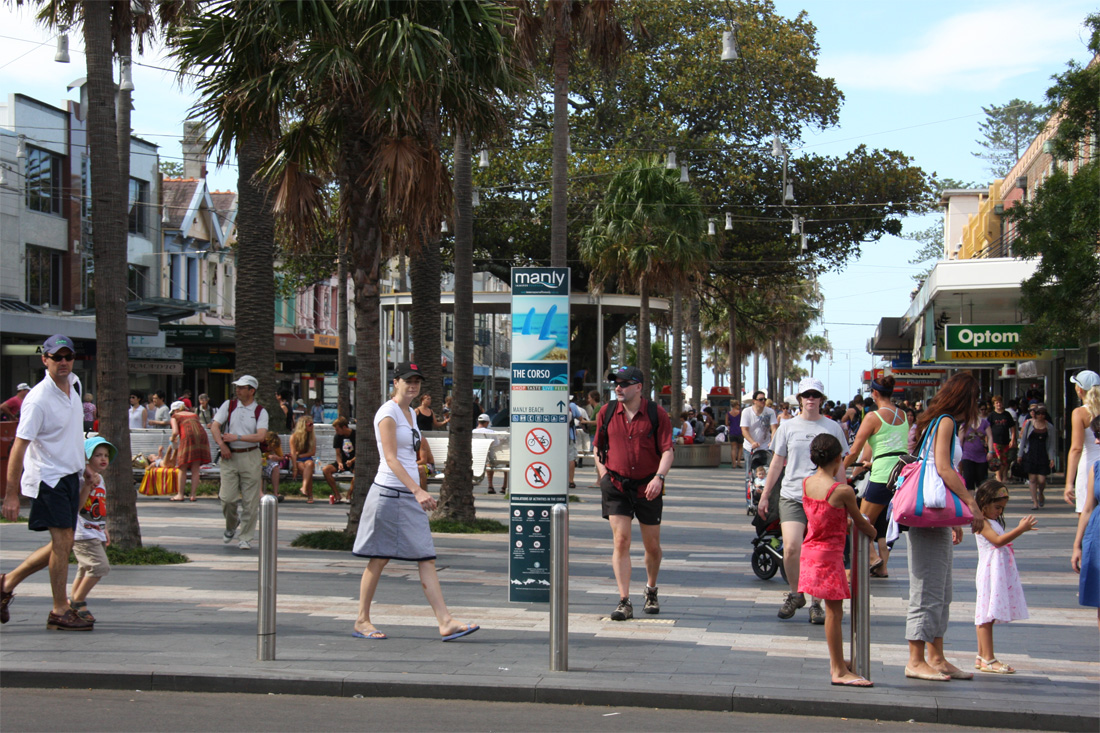
The Corso facing Manly Beach

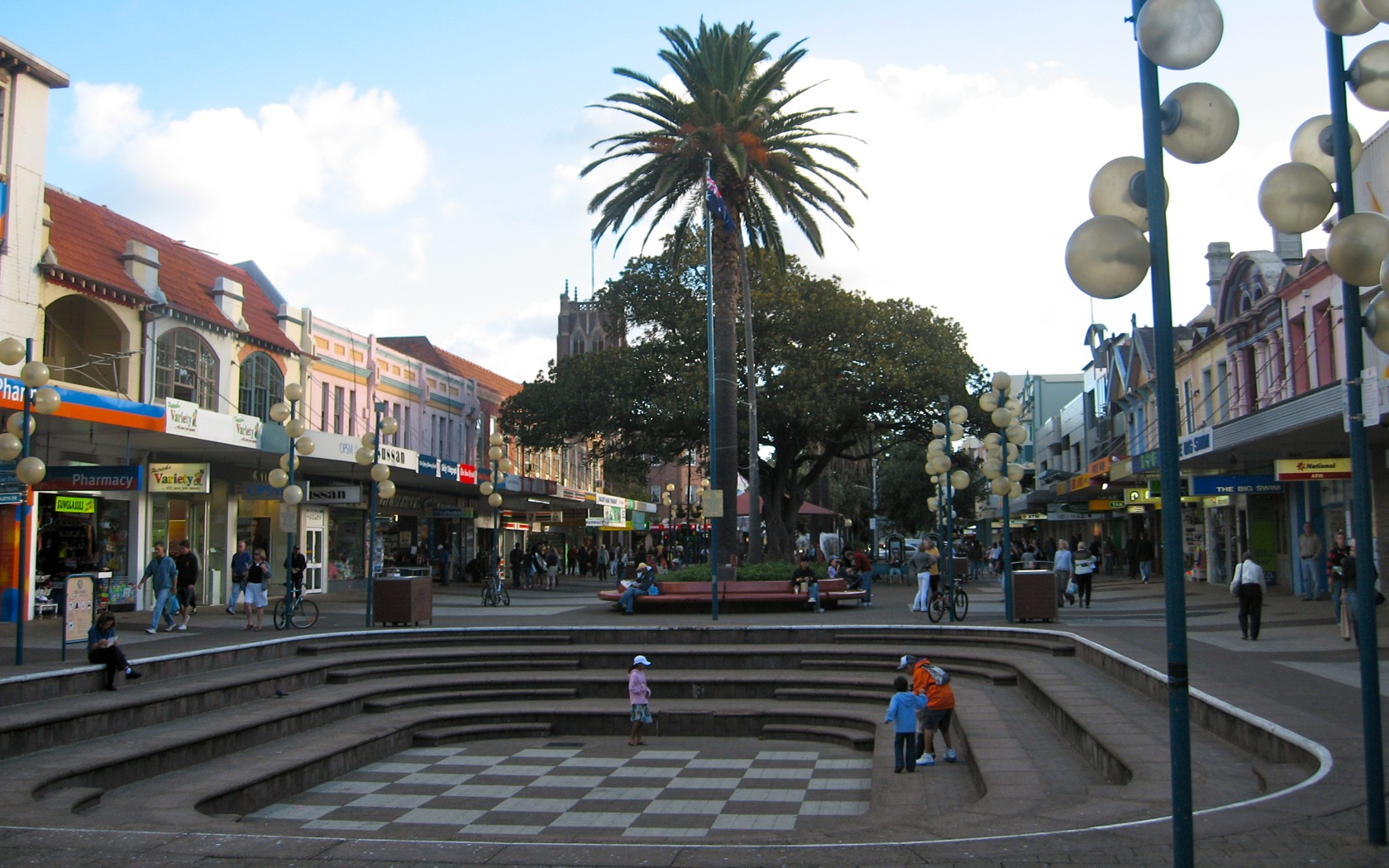
The amphitheatre at The Corso prior to its removal in the 2007 redevelopment

== See also ==
- Trams in Sydney - Manly lines
- List of shopping streets and districts by city
