= Manly Beach =

Beach in New South Wales, Australia

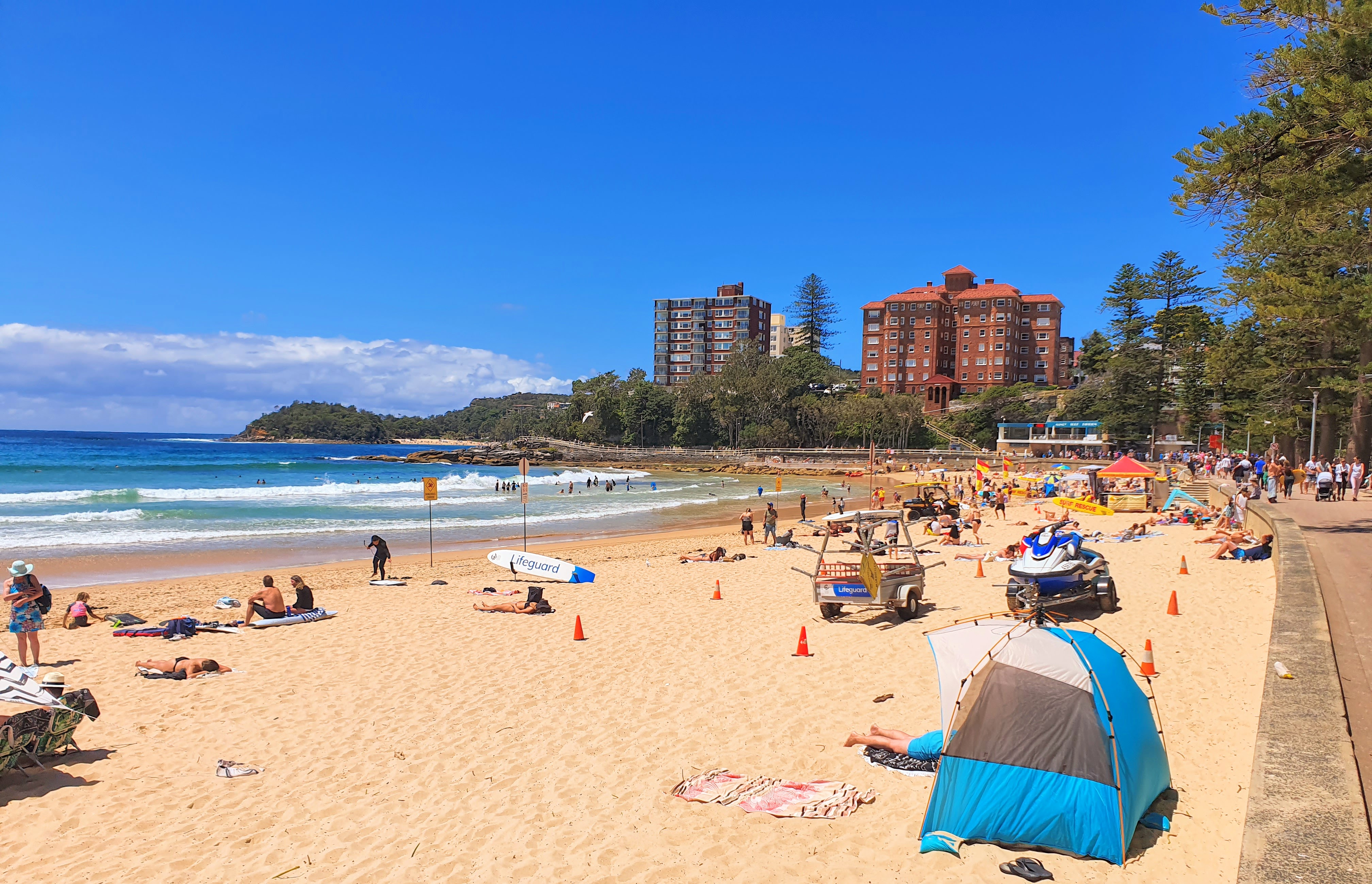
- View of southern section of Manly Beach, with Shelly Beach in the background

- Location within east Sydney
- Location: Manly, New South Wales
- Nearest city: Sydney
- Coordinates: 33°47′23″S 151°17′16″E
- Governing body: Northern Beaches Council

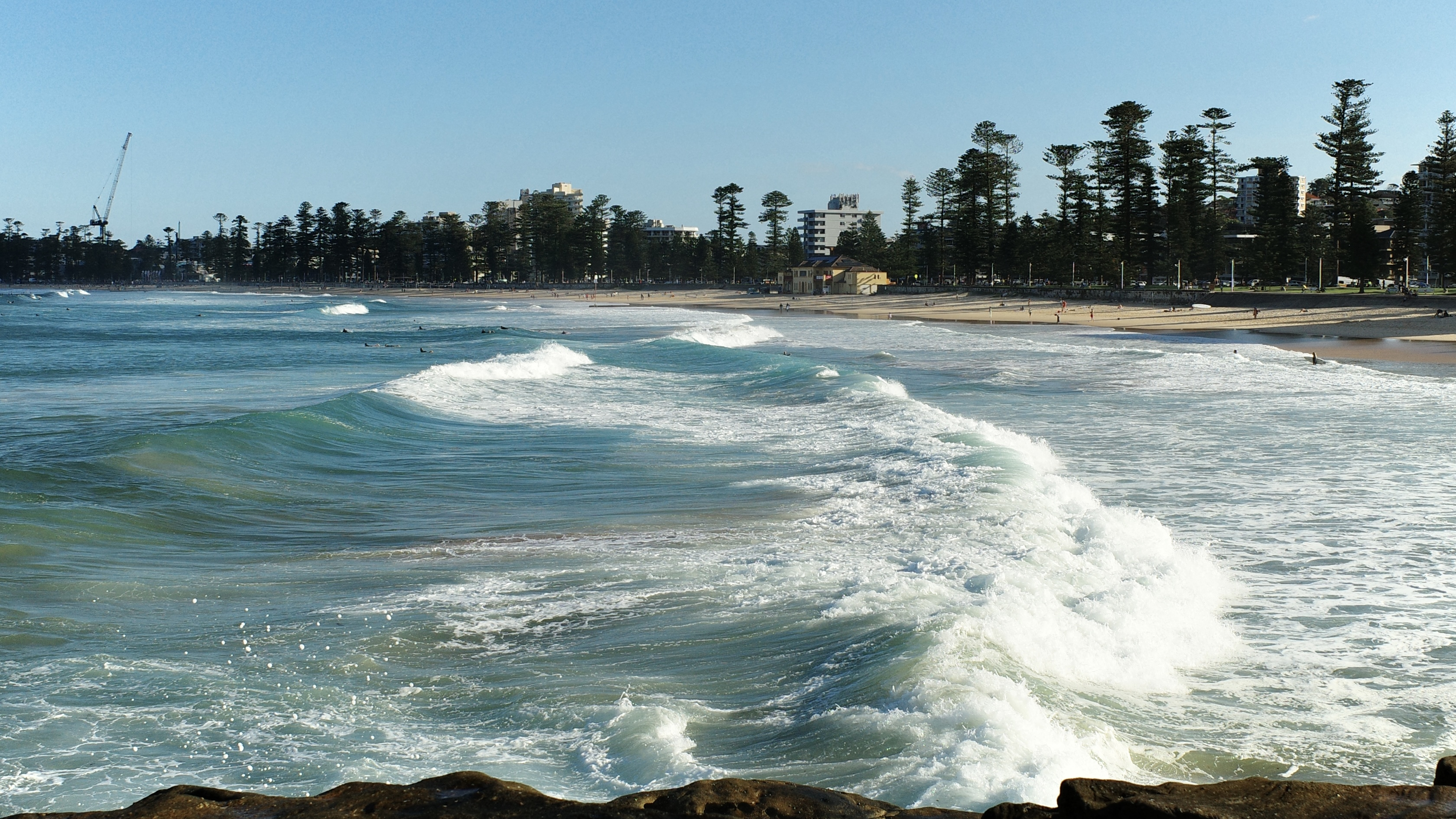
Manly Beach, 2025

Manly Beach is a beach situated among the Northern Beaches of Sydney, Australia. From north to south, the three main sections are Queenscliff, North Steyne and South Steyne.

== Etymology ==
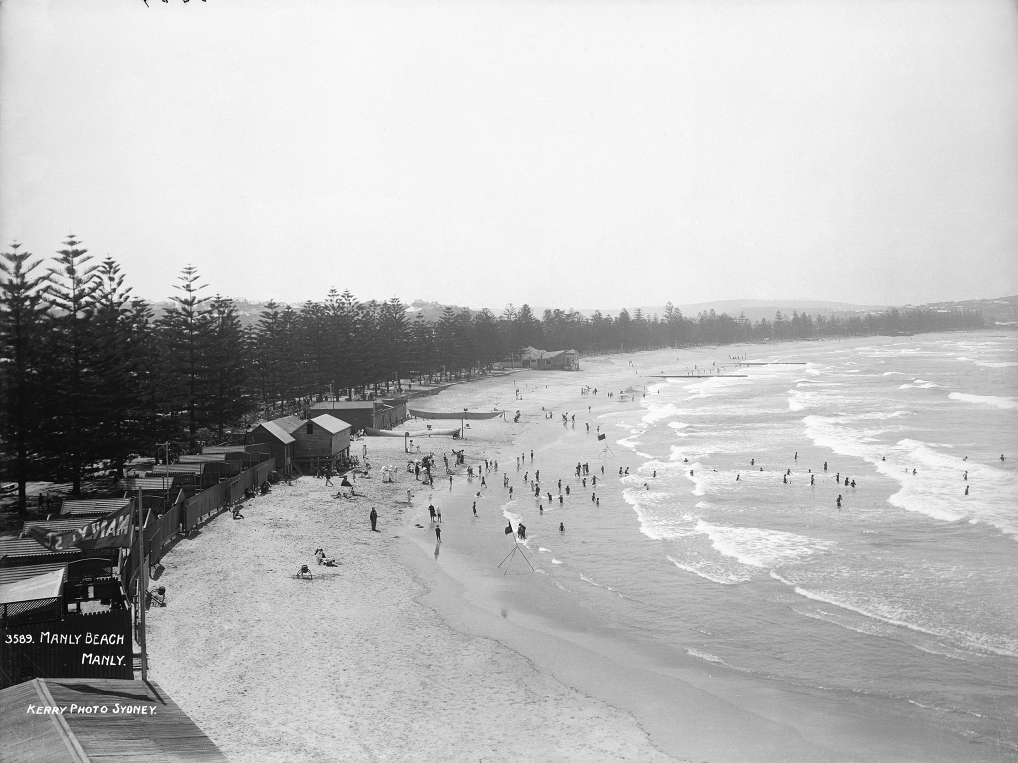
Manly Beach circa 1900

The beach was named by Captain Arthur Phillip for the indigenous people living there. He wrote, "Their confidence and manly behaviour made me give the name of Manly Cove to this place".

== Commercial area ==
Within walking distance of Manly Beach along the oceanway is Fairy Bower and Shelly Beach. There are shops, restaurants, night clubs, and bars in town.

== Patrol ==
Northern Beaches Council lifeguards operate a year-round service at South Steyne, and operate from October to April at North Steyne and Queenscliff. Lifesavers from Manly Life Saving Club also patrol on weekends and public holidays between October and May.

== Access ==
Travelling to Manly from Sydney's main ferry terminal, Circular Quay, takes 22 to 30 minutes by ferry. The Corso, a pedestrian plaza and one of Manly's main streets for shopping and dining, runs from the Manly wharf and harbour beach, across the peninsula to Manly Beach, where it marks the boundary between North Steyne and South Steyne.

== Gallery ==
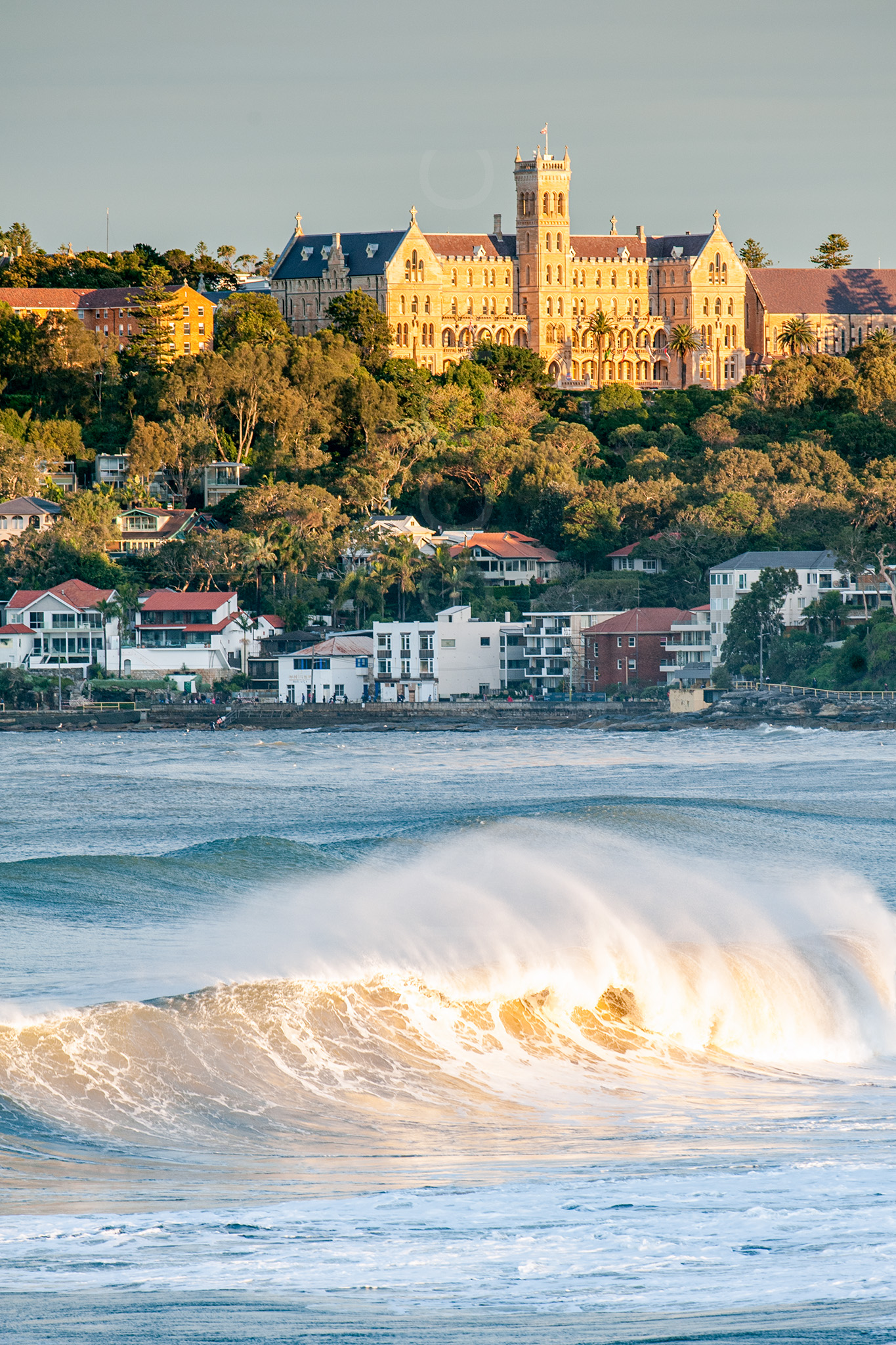
Manly Beach with big surf

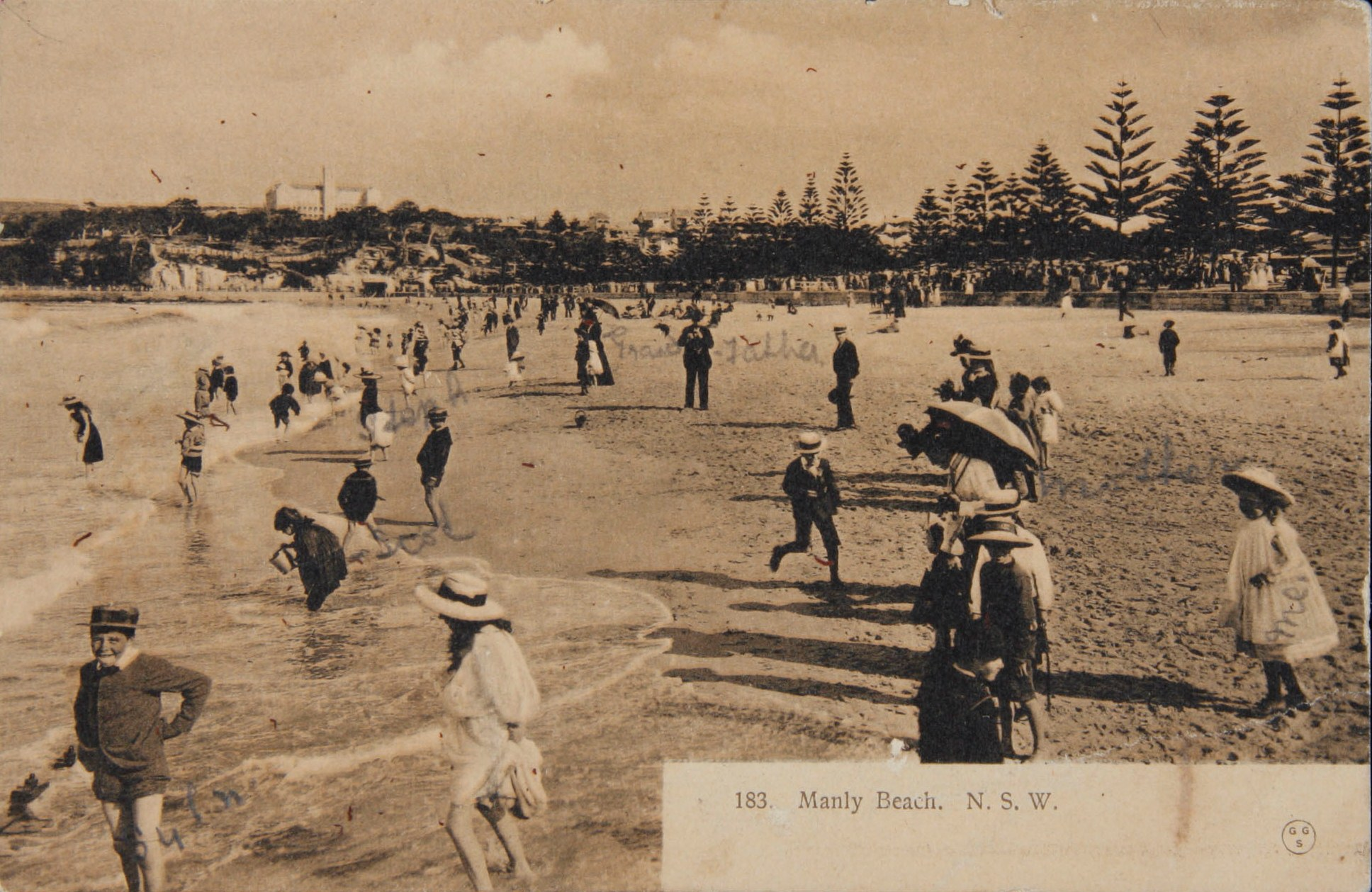
Manly Beach c. 1905

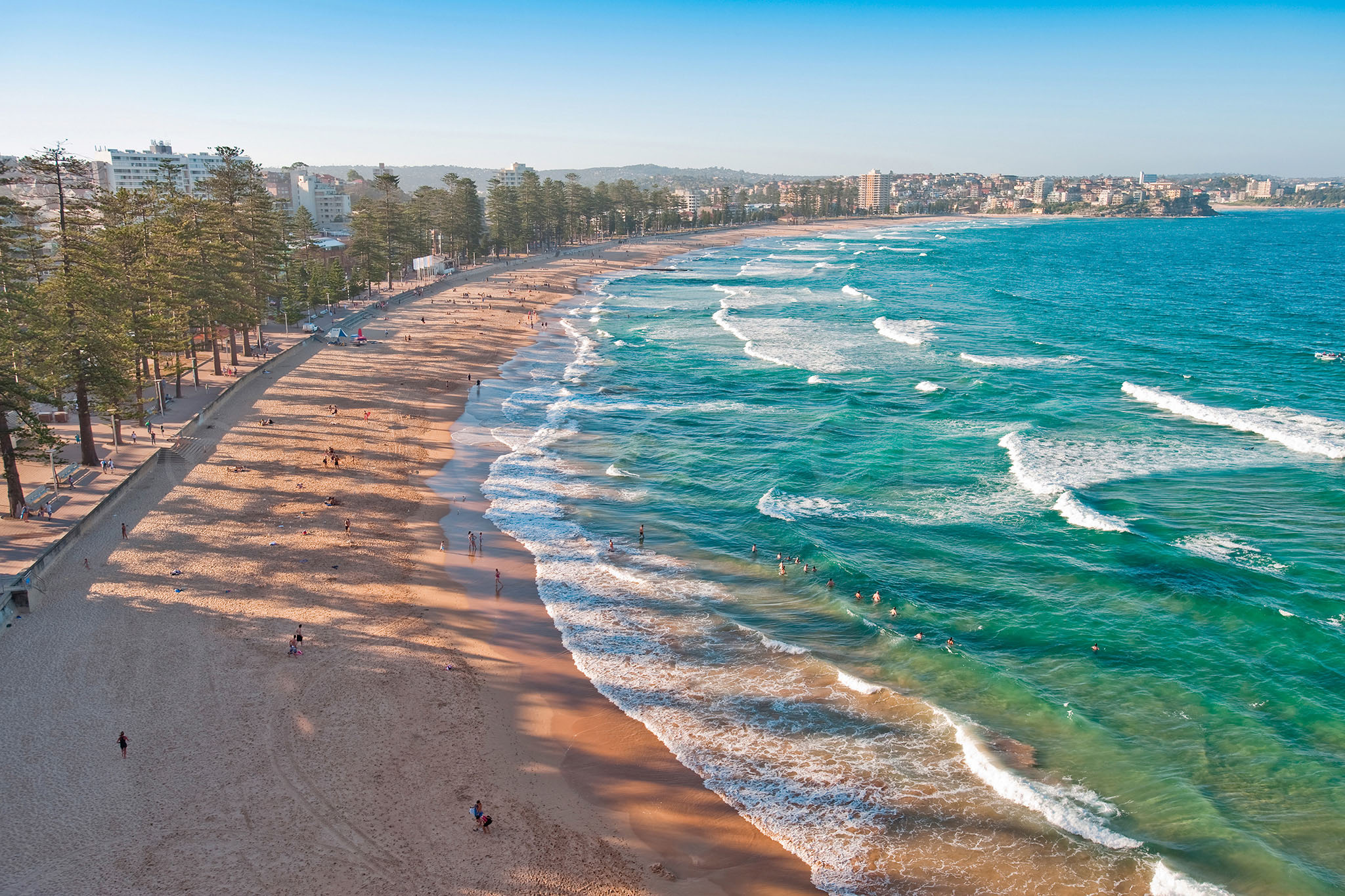
Manly Ocean Beach from South Steyne

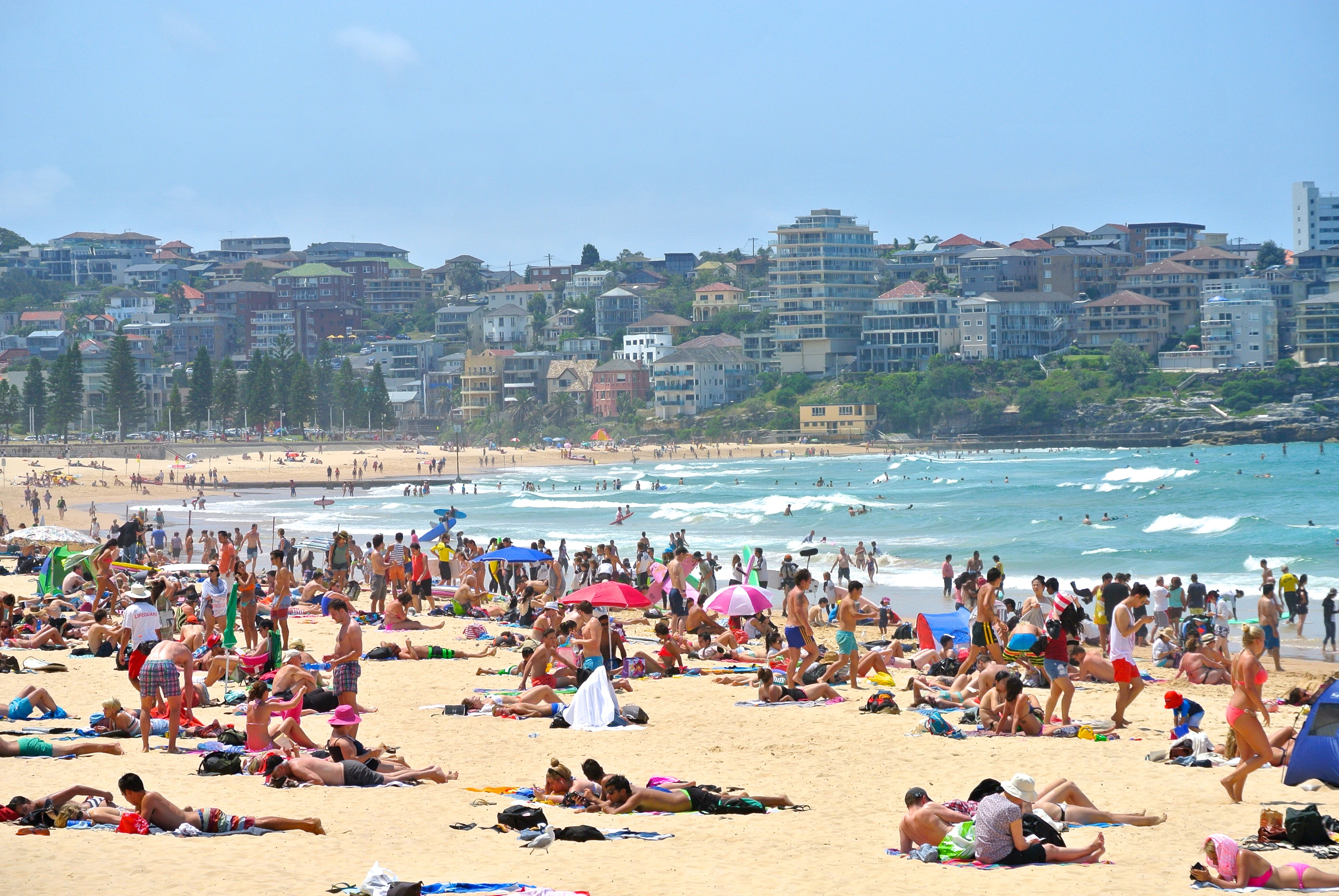
Manly Beach in summer

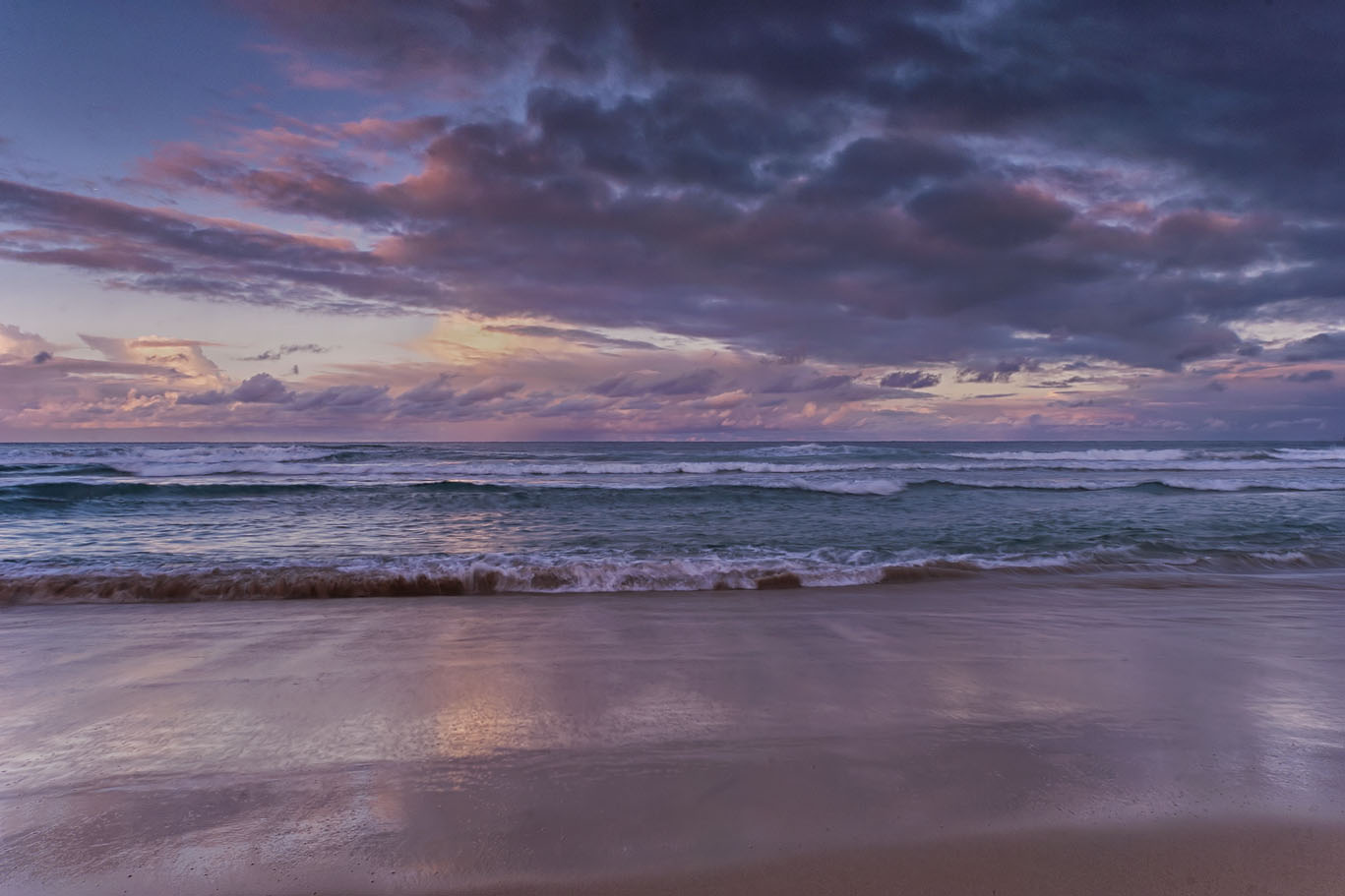
Clouds over Manly Beach

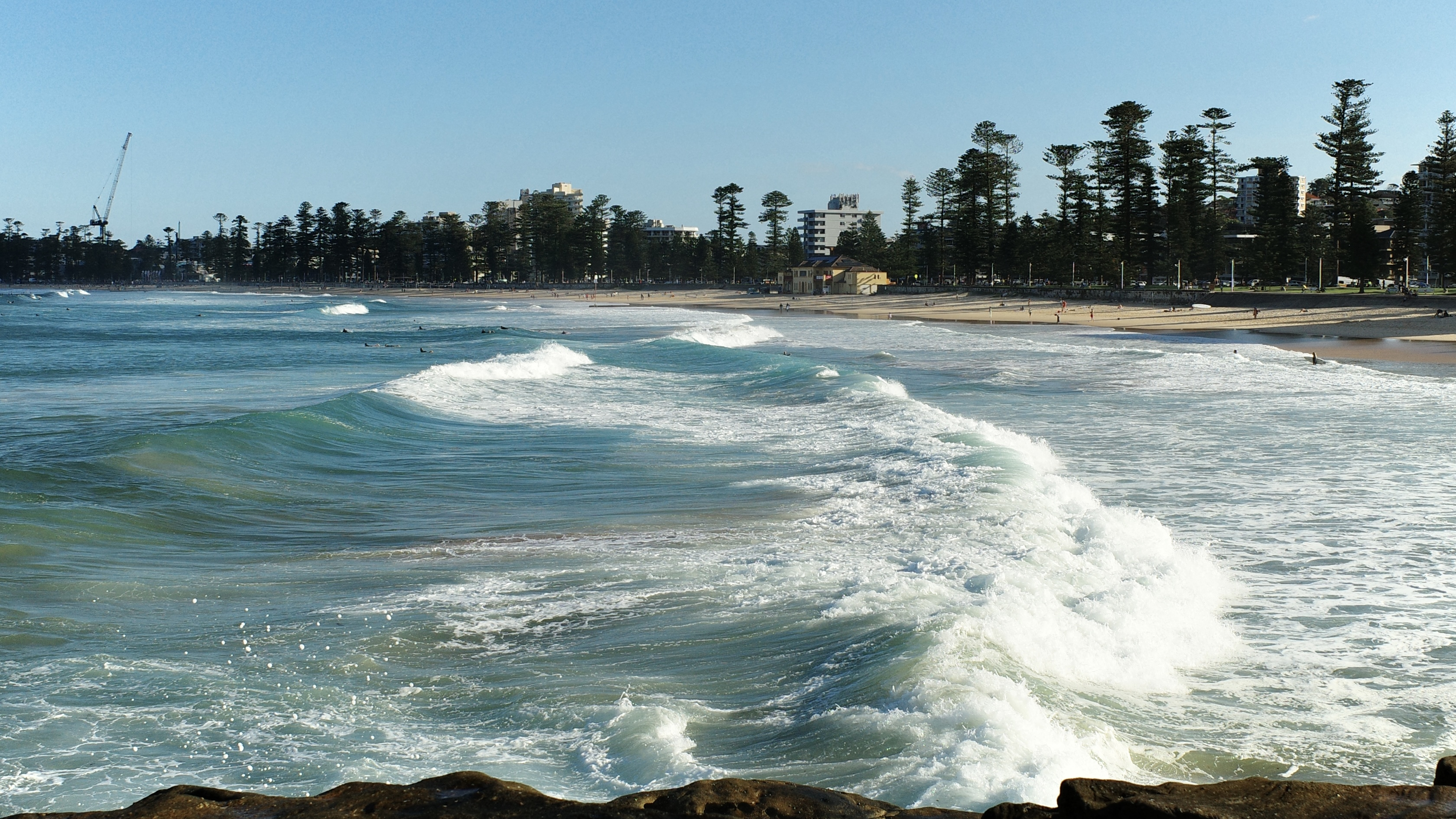
Manly Beach 2025
