= Breakwater Battery =

Coastal defence battery

Coordinates: 34°28′32.70″S 150°54′49.27″E

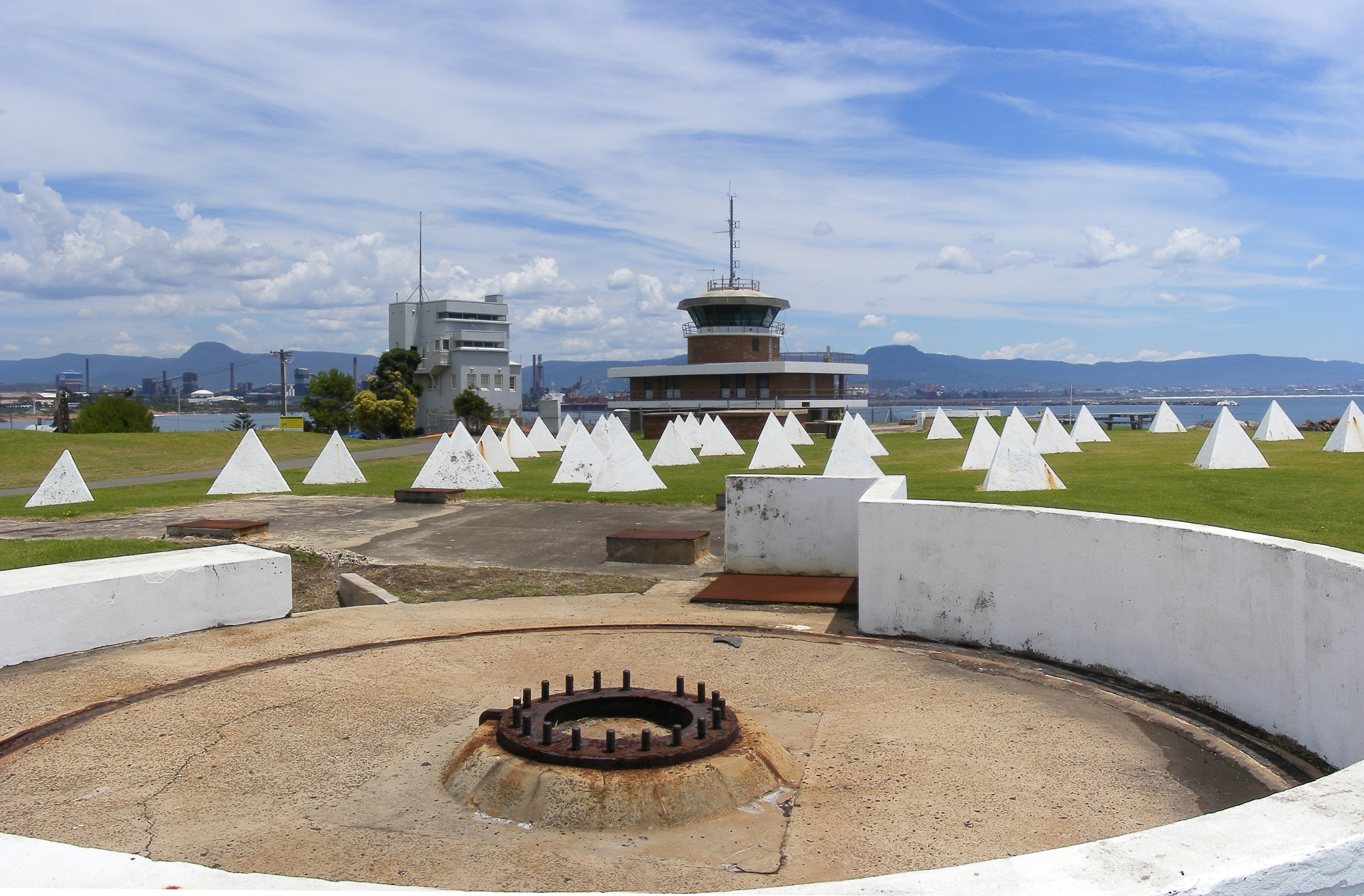
Gun emplacement 1 at the Breakwater Battery.

Breakwater Battery was a coastal defence battery at Port Kembla, New South Wales, Australia during World War II.

The Breakwater Battery was constructed in 1939 to provide protection for Port Kembla from enemy shipping and submarines. Two 6 inch Mk XI gun emplacements with related underground facilities were constructed near the southern breakwater at Port Kembla.

The battery and observation post (now a military museum) were key structures of the command centre for Fortress Kembla during World War II.

== Gallery ==
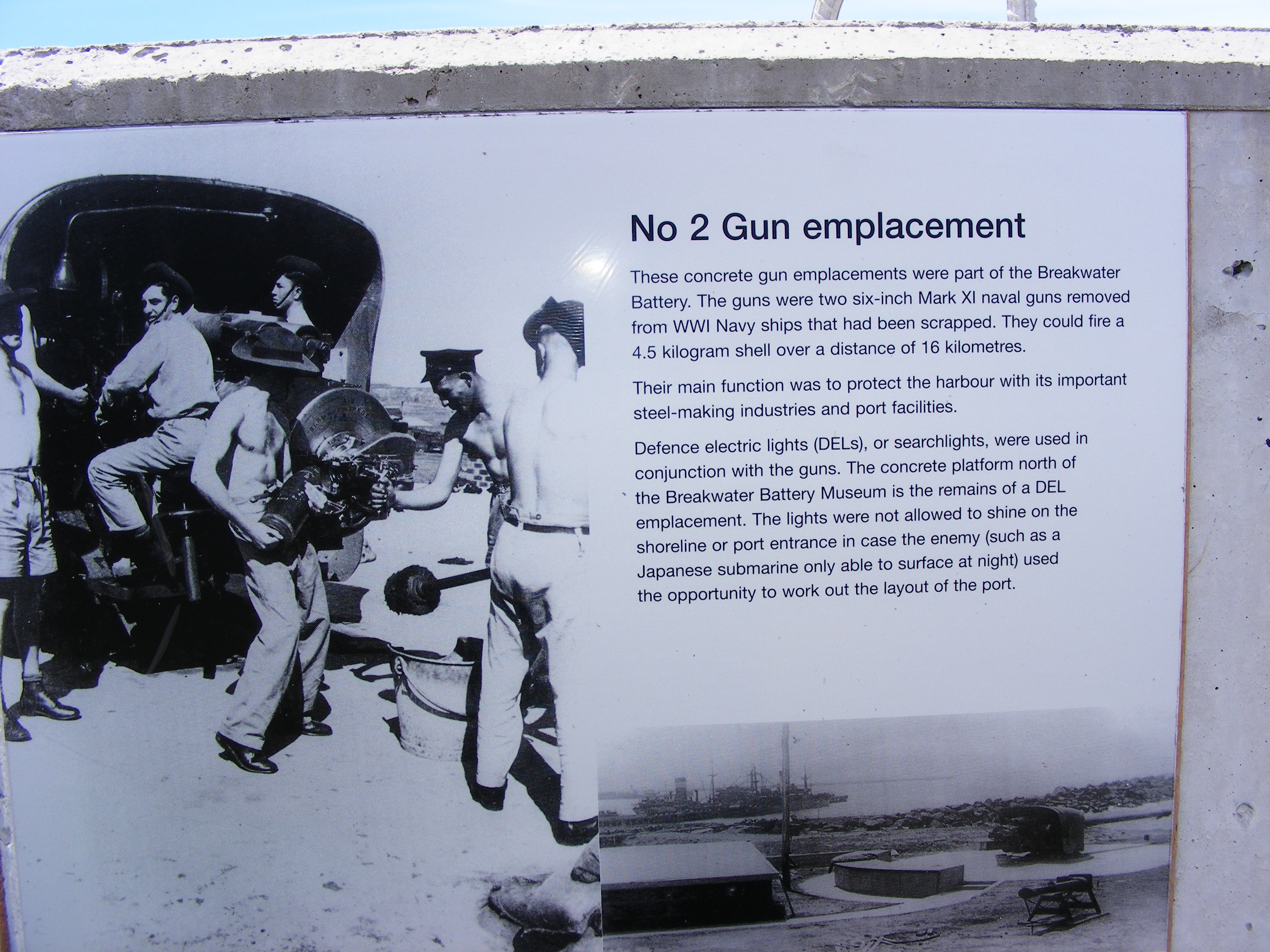

== See also ==
- Military history of Australia
