= Fairy Bower Beach =

Beach in New South Wales, Australia

Coordinates: 33°47′55″S 151°17′34″E

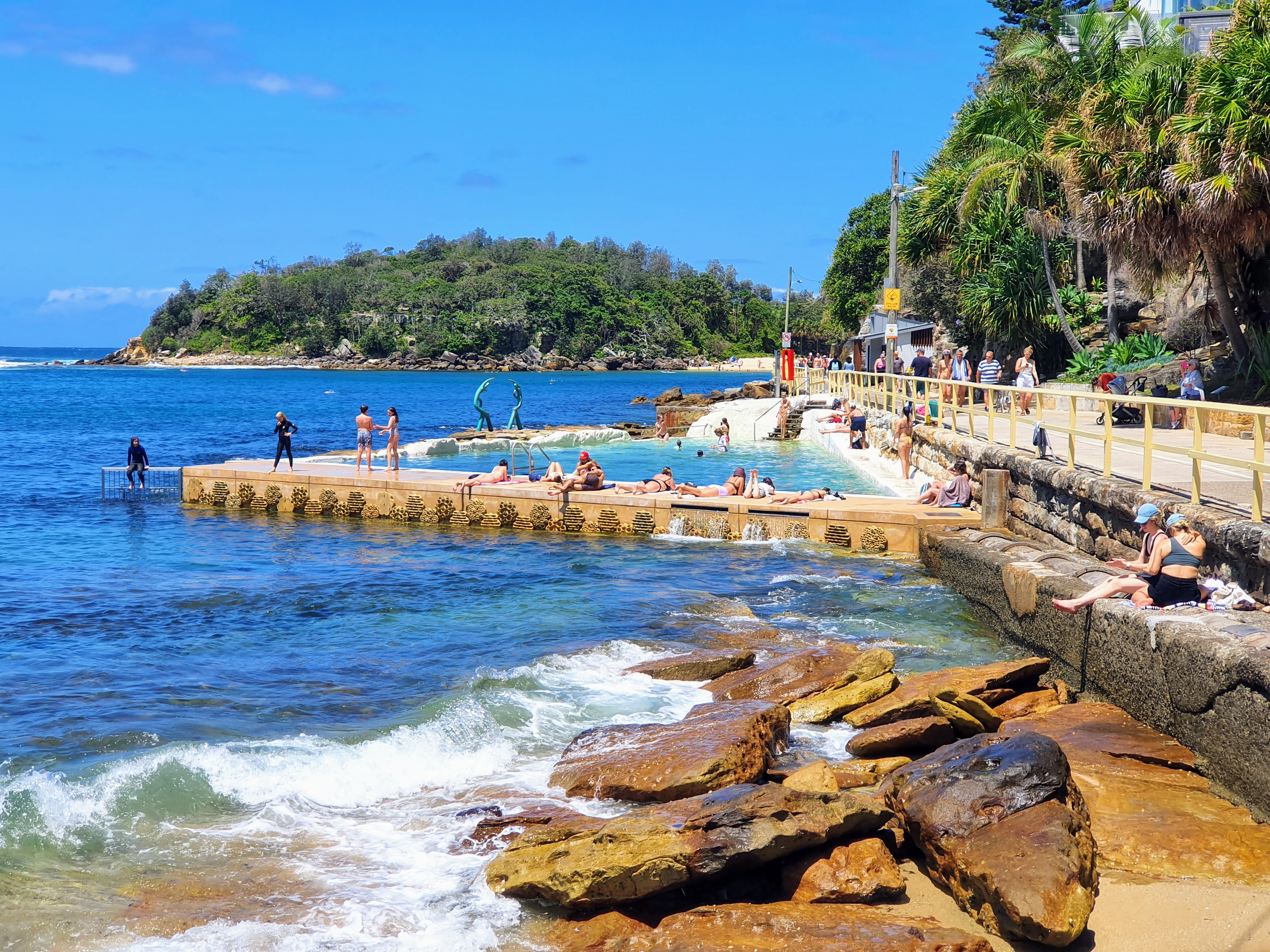
The tidal ocean rockpool has been upgraded in December 2021

Fairy Bower is a beach in the Manly area of Sydney, New South Wales, Australia.

Fairy Bower is an affluent area, located close to Shelly Beach (Manly) and North Head. The International School of Management Sydney (ICMS) and the Bower Surf Spot are located here. A scenic walk links Manly Beach to Fairy Bower and Shelly Beach. Jan Warhurst, a local diver, is famed for discovering a number of new species of catfish in the marine park.

Dusky Whaler sharks are seen regularly by divers in this area.
