= Wallace Battery =

Artillery battery in New South Wales, Australia

Wallace Battery was an artillery battery located on the northern side of the entrance to the Hunter River at Stockton, New South Wales, Australia. The battery was part of Fortress Newcastle. Two 6 inch Mk VII guns were installed at Fort Wallace in 1913. In 1940 the 6 inch guns were replaced by two 9.2-inch Mk X guns in emplacements.

The two 6 inch Mk. VII naval guns from Wallace Battery, were installed at Praed Point Battery, Rabaul.
