= Praed Point Battery =

Defensive structure in Papua New Guinea

Praed Point Battery was a coastal-defence installation at Praed Point, East New Britain, Papua New Guinea during World War II. It was built in 1941 by Royal Australian Engineers of Lark Force, together with 'L' Coastal Defence Battery of the Royal Australian Artillery. The battery defended St. George's Channel and the approaches to Blanche Bay.

Because of the topography of Praed Point, the guns were located at different levels down the hillside. The battery was commanded by Major James Rowland Purcell Clark, and was equipped with two six-inch Mk. VII naval guns, formerly from Wallace Battery, and two H.C.D. 90cm Mk VI searchlights.

The battery was destroyed on 22 January 1942 during a Japanese air raid, with the upper gun being blown off its mount and sliding down the slope, knocking out the lower gun emplacement. Eleven men were killed in the attack.
