= Tomaree Battery =

Artillery battery in New South Wales, Australia

Coordinates: 32°42′53″S 152°11′10″E

Tomaree Battery (Fort Tomaree) was an artillery battery located on the southern side of the entrance to Port Stephens at Tomaree Head, New South Wales, Australia. The battery was built during 1941 during the Second World War as part of Fortress Newcastle and was completed in 1942.

Two 6 inch Mark VII guns in emplacements were located at the battery. Another smaller battery of two 3 pounder guns, known as Surf Battery, was also located at Tomaree Head.
