= Park Battery =

Artillery battery in New South Wales, Australia

Park Battery was an artillery battery located in King Edward Park near The Hill, New South Wales, Australia. The battery was part of Fortress Newcastle. Two 6 inch Mk VII guns were installed at Park Battery.
