= Shelly Beach (Manly) =

Beach in Manly, New South Wales, Australia

Coordinates: 33°48′1.91″S 151°17′52.06″E

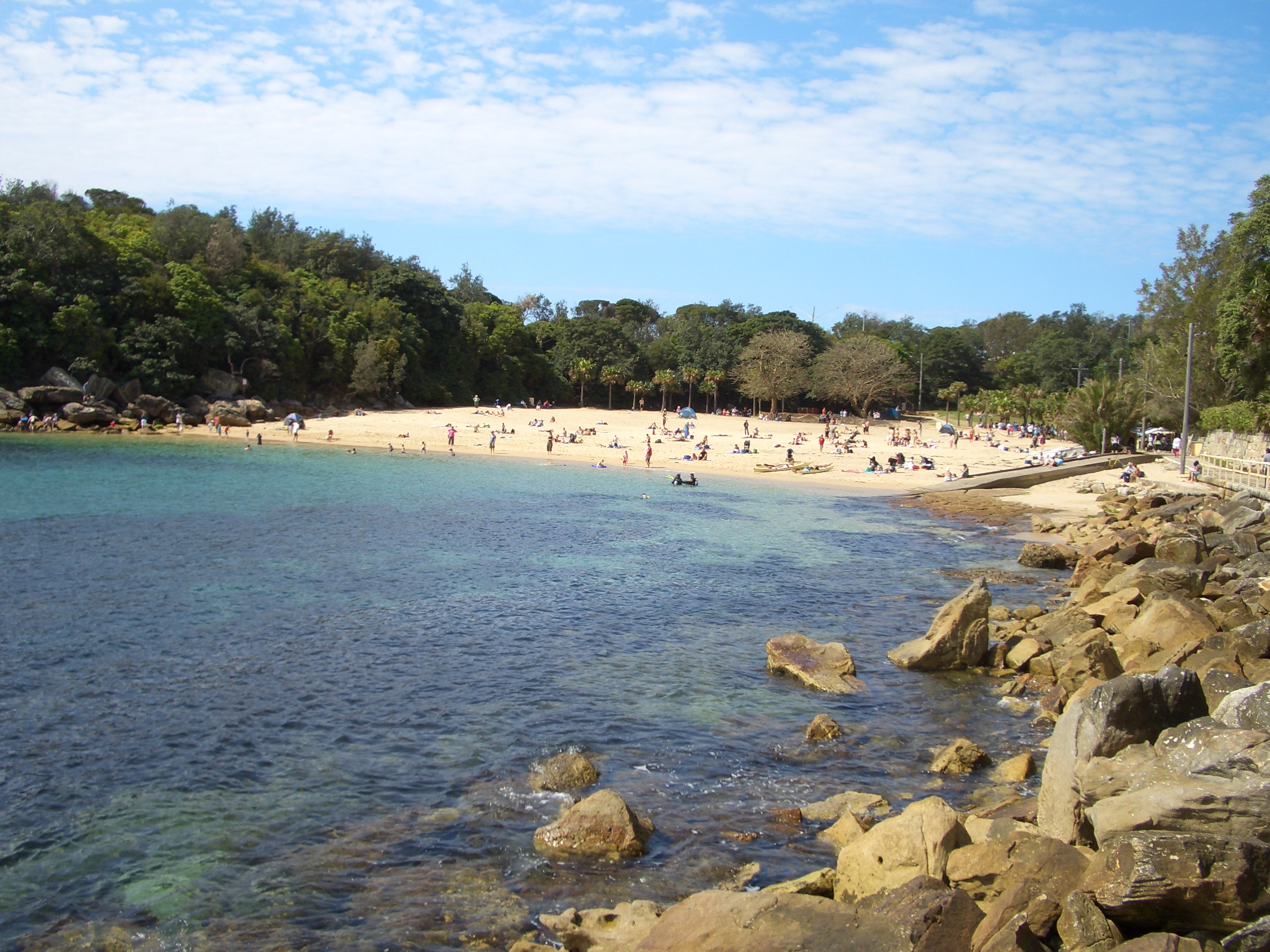
Shelly Beach, Manly

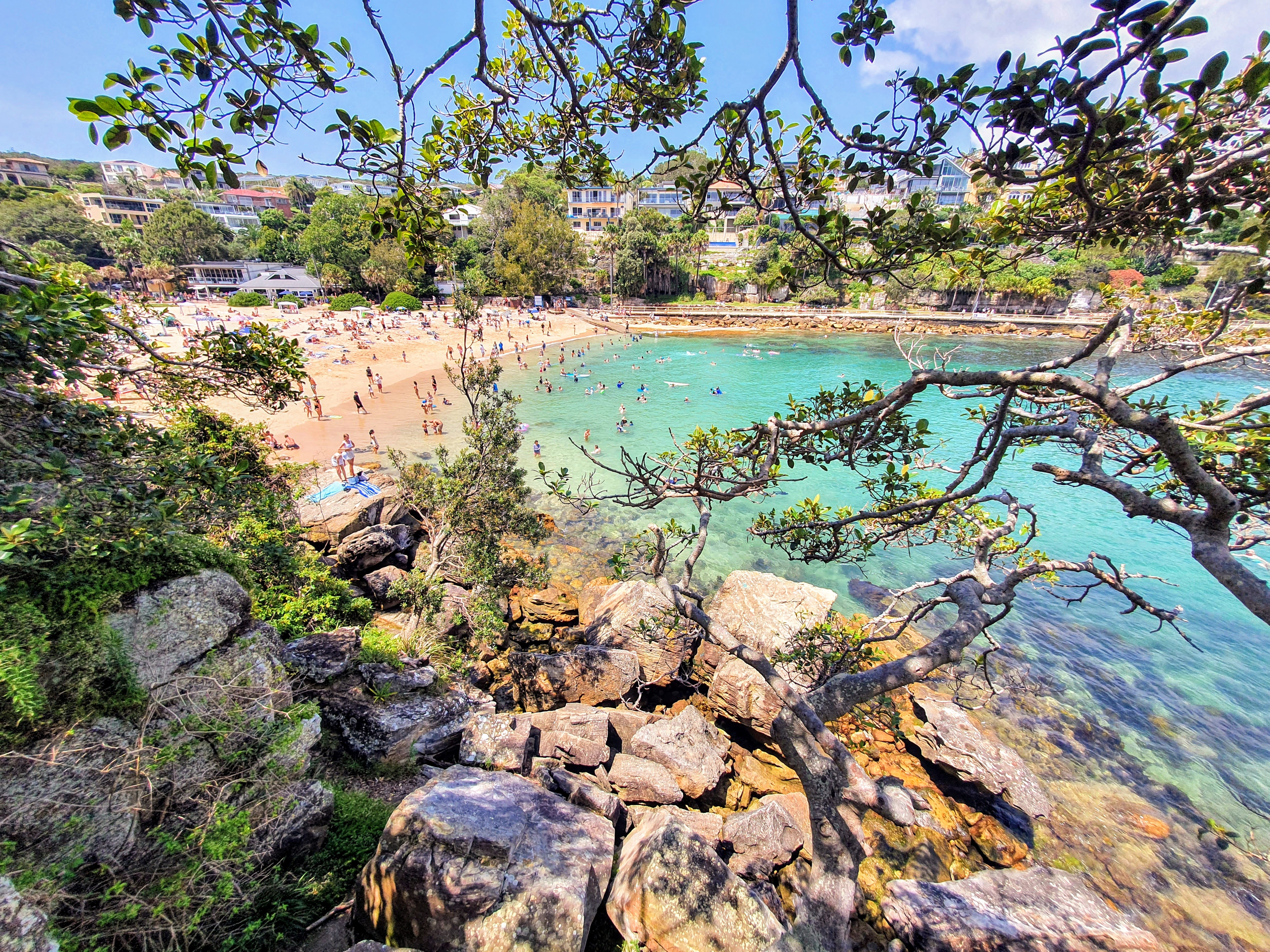
Beautiful protected beach perfect for snorkeling and swimming

Shelly Beach location map

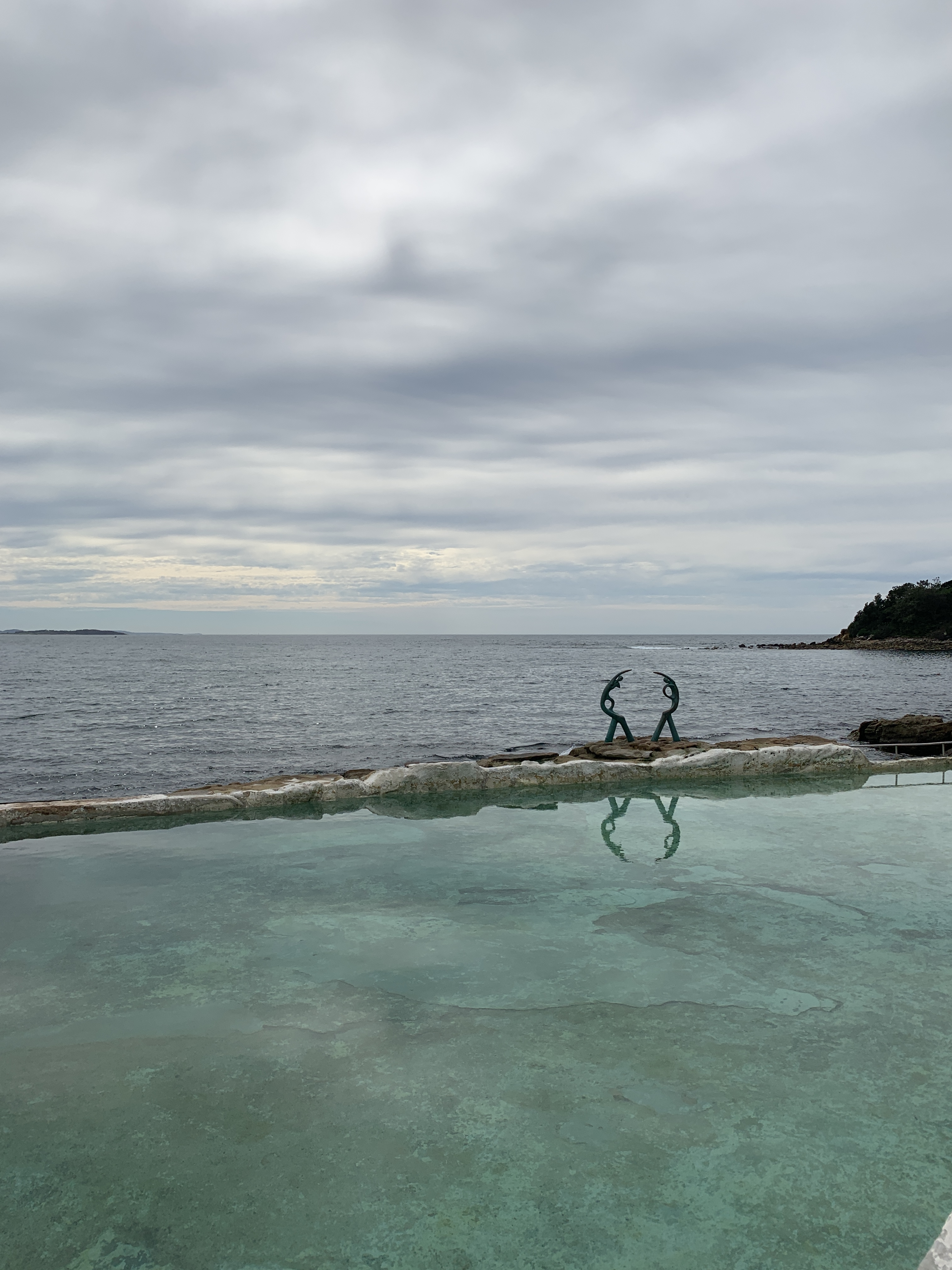
The now repaired Sea Nymphs sculpture at Fairy Bower Pool

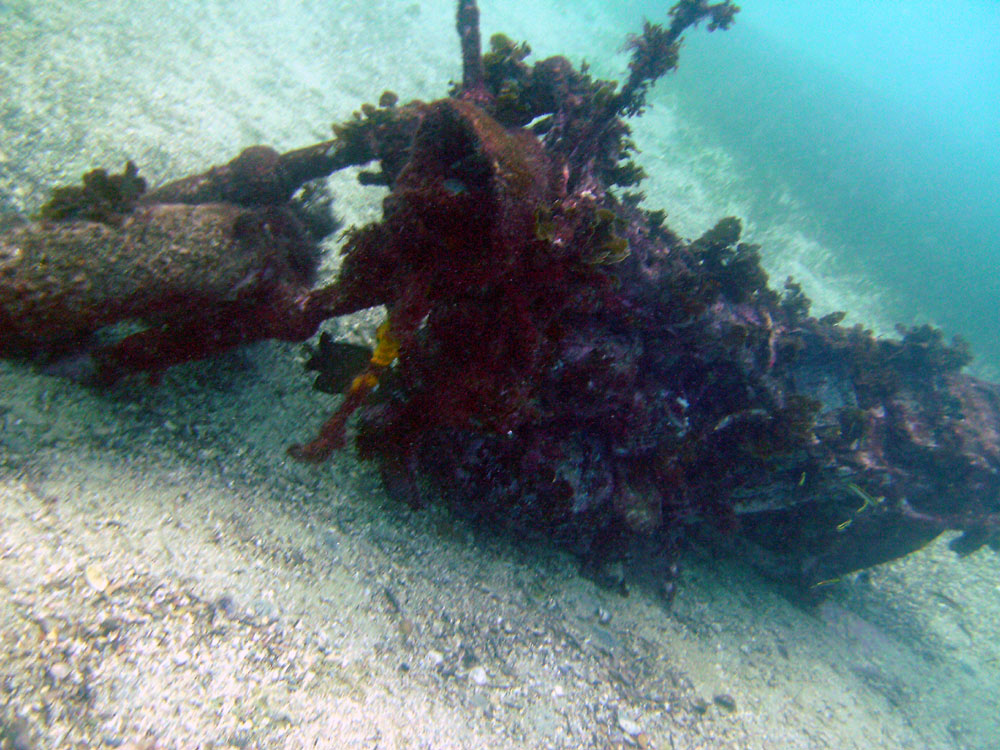
Motorbike 'wreck' at Shelly

Shelly Beach (also known as Shelley Beach) is a beach located in Manly, a suburb of Sydney, New South Wales, Australia. It is adjacent to North Head and Fairy Bower. Shelly Beach is a western facing beach on the eastern coast of Australia.

Shelly Beach is part of the no take Cabbage Tree Bay Aquatic Reserve.

== History ==
There is evidence of occupation of Aboriginal people in the area; in particular a shell midden has been recorded near the Fairy Bower car park. This is the reason for its name even though the beach itself is not that shelly. One hundred years ago Shelly Beach was a haven for boat owners, Providing protection from winds and seas from the south. What's also changed is the hillside, which in the early 1920s was home to only several buildings but is now covered with expensive homes from which their occupants can take advantage of the expansive views to the north. There is an old motorbike standing on the seabed in the middle of the bay in around 8m of water.

On the weekend of June 4 & 5, 2016 a severe storm caused extensive damage to the walkway between Manly Beach and Shelly Beach. This included considerable damage to the pathway - with large slabs of concrete being lifted and displaced, the complete disappearance of a small toilet block, damage to an iconic sculpture at Fairy Bower pool and large sections of the safety railing being destroyed. Due to safety concerns, a large barrier and warning signs were installed to discourage people from walking along the path until repairs were made. Despite this, many people ignored the warnings and simply climbed around the rocks to get back to the path. The barriers were removed in August 2016, following the completion of remediation work.

== Geography ==
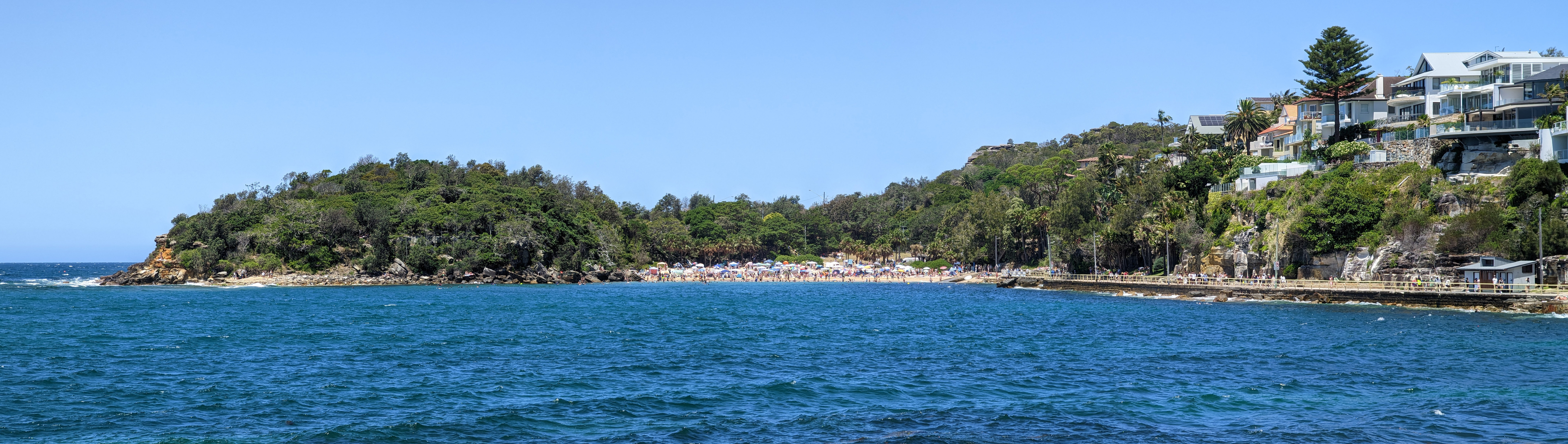
Panoramic view on a crowded summer day, from near the south end of Manly Beach

Shelly Beach is protected from the ocean swell by the reef that lies on the right hand side of the beach (when facing the ocean) and faces west. Cabbage Tree Bay is a small north-facing embayment that includes two small beaches. Shelly Beach is a reflective beach about 100 metres long. Shelly Beach is a protected marine reserve since it is part of Cabbage Tree Bay.

The visibility is good and a large variety of marine life can be seen there. It is excellent for scuba divers, and also for snorkelers as Shelly beach does not get very deep, its maximum depth being about 12 metres. Many areas are shallow with depths ranging from 2 to 6 metres. This particularity makes it popular for casual and regular snorkelers. Cabbage Tree Bay was declared a 'No Take' Aquatic Reserve on 31 March 2002.

On the western point of the beach is a surf break known as "Bower" which offers one of the most shallow breaking waves in Sydney. Further along from Bower are Winki and Deadman's, two other well-known breaks which are popular with surfers, especially on south-east, and east swells. Shelly Beach is also one of only a handful of west-facing ocean beaches on the east coast of Australia.

== Infrastructure ==
Facilities include 2 free electric barbecues, showers, toilets and a kiosk selling meals, drinks and coffee. There is a restaurant on the beach called The Boathouse Shelly Beach. There is a bush track around the headland with views of the Northern Beaches and North Head. The facilities also include parking at the rate of $8.00 an hour. Many scuba diving centres take students because it offers excellent conditions for an environment in which to learn SCUBA.

== Fame ==
In the opening scene of the 1983 film BMX Bandits, two characters ride their bicycles down the walkway between Manly Beach and Shelly Beach.

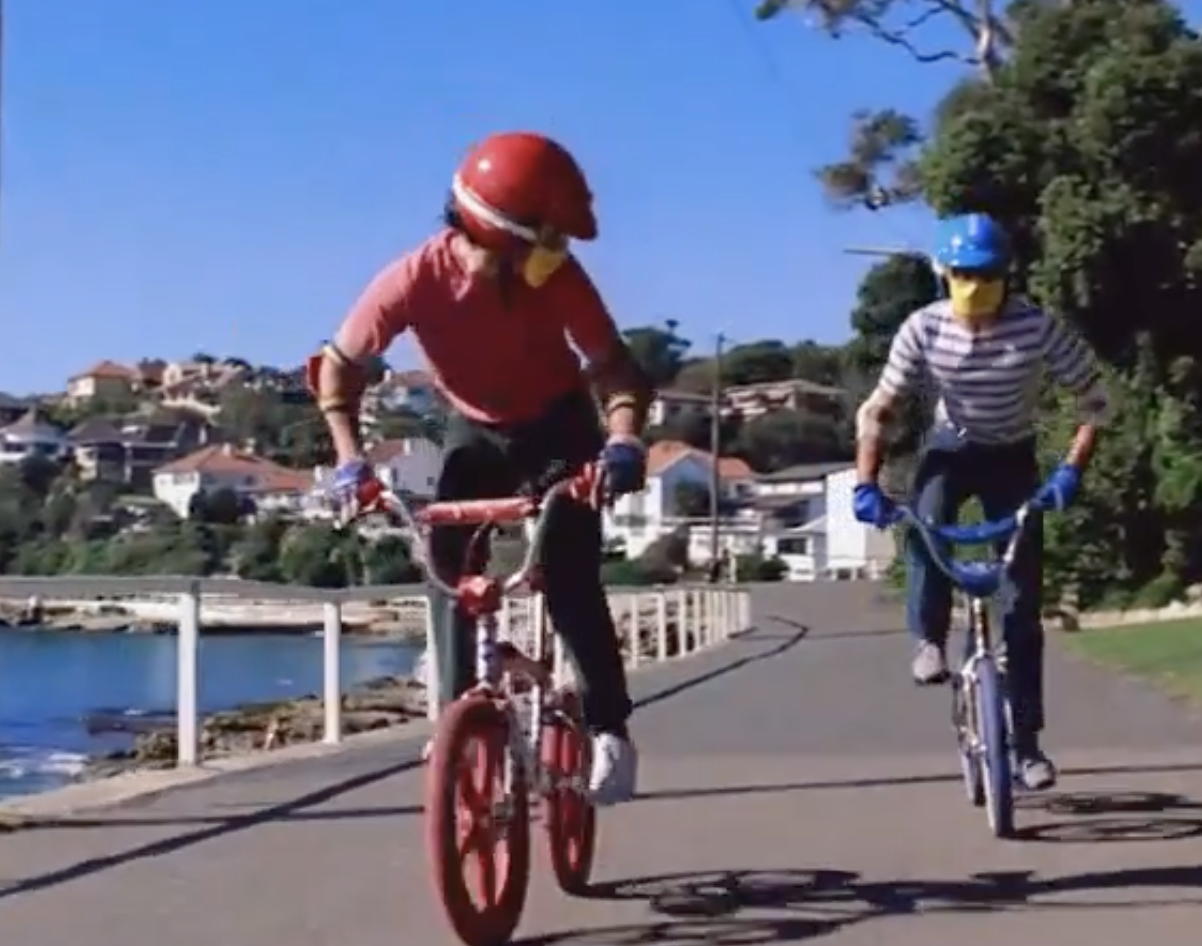
The opening scene of BMX Bandits, featuring Shelly Beach

== See also ==
- Beaches in Sydney
- Shelly Beach in Cronulla
- 2005 Cronulla riots
