= Radar, Coast Defense, Mark I =

British Army World War II radar system

Coast Defence Mark I
- Country of origin: United Kingdom
- Introduced: September 1939
- No. built: 120
- Frequency: 200 MHz
- PRF: 400 Hz
- Beamwidth: 1.5° (horizontal)
- Pulsewidth: 3 μs
- RPM: Up to 3.3
- Power: 150 kW
- Other names: Coast Artillery Mark I, CD Number 1 Mark I, Chain Home Low, AMES Type 2, CD/CHL, CDU

Radar, Coast Defence, Mark I, or CD Mk. I, was a radar system used by the British Army to detect ships, E-boats and U-boats during World War II. An Army-wide renaming exercise in 1943 made these the CD Number 1 Mark I, which confused things as unrelated sets were also made part of Number 1 with different Marks.

The initial concept was to provide early warning of German shipping in the English Channel or attempting to approach one of the UK's many ports. While being tested in July 1939 at the radar development site at Bawdsey Manor, operators noticed returns on their displays from the 9.2 in (230 mm) guns being test fired at Brackenbury Battery outside Harwich. The splashes of the shells in the water created blips that lasted long enough for the operators to measure their bearing and range. An adaptation with higher accuracy for directly guiding the Army's coastal artillery units was developed as Radar, Coast Artillery, Mark I, or CA Mk. I, but not put into operation. During early use, the name CD or CA was applied depending on the location of the radar, not the specific model installed.

During early testing it was noticed that the sets were also ideal for detecting low-flying aircraft. This was a significant problem for the Royal Air Force (RAF)'s Chain Home (CH) radars, which had difficulty with anything flying below about 5,000 ft (1,500 m). The Germans learned of this when they began mine laying operations in British ports and the Thames estuary, and began flying low-altitude intruder flights to take advantage of this limitation. In response, the RAF took over many of the CD sets being constructed and deployed them as Chain Home Low (CHL) at CH sites so they could share the existing telephone networks. It was some time before enough sets were built that the CHL needs were filled and wider deployment of CD and CA could begin.

The introduction of the cavity magnetron in 1940 led to new models of almost all existing radar sets, including new CD and CA systems. Work on the Mark I in the CA role was cancelled and a new CD/CA system based on the Royal Navy's Type 271 radar began to be deployed around 1941. Once again, the RAF interrupted this process when Luftwaffe began attacks at altitudes as low as 50 ft (15 m), and these were deployed under the name Chain Home Extra Low (CHEL) along likely approach routes. These attacks largely ended by the end of the year and CD and CA was able to fully expand with the new sets.

== Early work ==
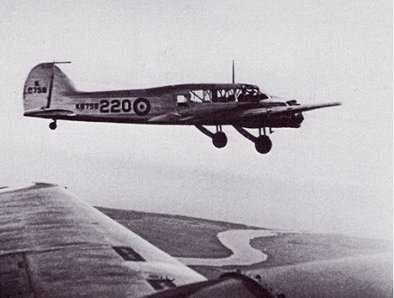
Ship detection by radar was demonstrated using antennas held by hand outside one of the hatches of Avro Anson K8758.

In October 1936, having learned of the formation of the Air Ministry Experimental Station (AMES) at Bawdsey Manor, the British Army's scoured their ranks looking for radio experts that would be able to help develop radars for Army use. Ironically, two of the researchers, W. A. S. Butement and P. E. Pollard, had been the first to suggest developing radar to detect ships in the English Channel in 1930, but the War Office proved uninterested at the time. Now, with the news that the Air Ministry had succeeded in detecting aircraft, they sent Butement and Pollard to Bawdsey to form the Military Applications Section, referred to universally as the Army Cell. They were given the task of using radar to accurately measure the range to a selected aircraft, a major problem for existing anti-aircraft artillery operations.

Around the same time, Henry Tizard grew concerned about the German reaction to the Chain Home radar. He concluded they would turn to night bombing, where the radar would still provide early warning of their approach, but the fighter aircraft would not be able to see their targets. His memo led Robert Watson-Watt to set up a new group within AMES to develop a radar that could be fit inside an aircraft to allow them to track down their targets. The resulting experimental system was being tested in 1937 when the operators noticed odd returns while flying near the shore of the Channel. They eventually realized these were the piers and cranes at the Harwich docks miles south of them. Shipping also appeared, but the team was unable to test this very well as their Handley Page Heyford was forbidden to fly over water.

To further test the concept, Robert Watson-Watt provided the team with two Avro Ansons that were able to fly out over the North Sea from nearby RAF Martlesham Heath. The testing system was crude; a small dipole antenna was held by hand outside one of the escape hatches and rotated looking for the peak signal, indicating the antenna was aligned with the target ship. This was not easy as the signal naturally fluctuated. The first successes were in August 1937.

=== Test systems ===
The Army Cell had already been asked about ship detection in April 1938 (Note: The passage in Sayer is not clear, it may have been Air Ministry people who had first brought up the issue.) and they responded in May that they believed they could have a set in operation within a year of getting more help. It was not until October 1938 that such help arrived and work began.

At the time, they were exploring two concepts. The first was a set operating at 1.2 m wavelength that had initially been developed by Edward George Bowen's team for airborne use, and was designed to use several Yagi antennas ganged together to improve directionality. Experiments demonstrated it was difficult to keep the antennas tuned to the required degree. The second concept operated at the extremely short wavelength, for the time, of 18 cm and used parabolic reflectors to produce very good directionality. Development of this model dragged on and it was still not ready for testing in February 1939 when the rapid development of a third concept suggested development of the other two be shut down.

The third set was an adaptation of the Air Ministry's 1.5 m sets for aircraft, developed directly from the hand-held sets in the Anson. To improve directionality, the system used a "split" antenna, today known as lobe switching, in which two antennas are placed close together in front of a common reflector. A switch rapidly connects the transmitter to one antenna and then the other, while adding a small electrical delay to one of the two antennas on reception. The result is that two blips appear on the display for every target, and the one that is more closely aligned with the antenna will be longer. By rotating the entire antenna until the two blips are the same length, the system can accurately track the angle of the target. Testing in May demonstrated that angles on the order of 15 minutes of arc, a quarter of a degree, were possible. A 60 foot (18 m) high mounting allowed ships of 2,000 long tons (2,000 t) to be detected at 17,000 yards (16 km).

During these tests, the first examples of anomalous propagation were seen, with detections on sailing boats at distances that would normally be below the radar horizon. Another important result was that the sets detected low-flying aircraft on several occasions, including one seaplane flying at 500 feet (150 m) altitude at 20 miles (32 km) distance, well below the lowest angles that Chain Home could achieve. The Air Ministry researchers immediately ordered a second set in mobile form that could be moved around the countryside to test its performance from various altitudes on sea-side cliffs.

On 20 June 1939, Winston Churchill visited Bawdsey, where he was shown the experimental CD unit, along with CH. In July, the experimental set at Bawdsey happened to be operating when a coast defence artillery station at Brackenbury Battery protecting the Harwich docks was test firing their BL 9.2-inch guns. To the radar operator's surprise, the splashes of the shells in the water produced strong blips on the displays and they lasted more than long enough to take measurements of their range and bearing. From this point the concept of Coast Artillery radar was developed in parallel with CD, mostly based on the same hardware. During a demonstration to Army artillery technical staff in August, they saw not only the splashes, but even the individual rounds on their way through the air.

The major difference in the CA role was introduced by Butement around the same time, the spiral time base. Most radars of the era used a A-scope type display, where the blip was drawn horizontally across the face of the cathode ray tube (CRT), with a maximum length of about 9 inches (230 mm). If the operator might be expected to measure the blip to an accuracy of a millimetre, and the display was showing 20 miles (32 km) range, that was an accuracy of about 140 metres (460 ft), too low for gunnery. Butement's system moved the blip in a spiral motion such that the range to the target was a combination of the distance from the centre of the tube as well as the angle around it. This produced a line that was up to 7 feet (2.1 m) long, dramatically improving range accuracy. If the same 1 mm accuracy was measured on this display, that represented a distance of only 15 metres.

=== CD Mark I ===
In July 1939 a development contract was sent out to build prototypes of production versions based on the results of these tests, with the goal being to release the final design in October. Both the Air Ministry and Army were part of the contract, as the RAF planned to use the system under the name Chain Home Low (CHL). The only major difference between CHL and CD was that the former later included a plan position indicator (PPI) which made it easier to track fast-moving targets. This was not as useful in the CD role where the targets were much slower moving.

The declaration of war on 3 September resulted in pre-war plans being put into immediate effect, which included the movement of the radar teams away from their exposed location on the Channel coast. The Army Cell was ordered to move to the Christchurch area, which had been heavily fortified due to its location near Bournemouth and Southampton. The CD team was sent to a shoreside location with practically no infrastructure other than a few pre-fab buildings. The team spent the next days involved in everything from running electrical wires to digging sewer lines. Despite this, they were able to restart development of the production sets soon after arriving.

Within days another demonstration was arranged, this time for Admiral James Somerville, with the specific intent of testing the system for use against submarines. Butement hastily returned to Bawdsey and got the original system operational in time for HMS H34 to pass by in two days. For this demonstration, John Cockcroft was invited to attend as well.

As they were demonstrating the system to track the submarine, an RAF aircraft, apparently thinking it was a German U-boat, began attacking it. Somerville personally warned them off with "effective naval phraseology" and the test went on to successfully prove the radar could detect submarines as well as ships. As Cockroft described it:

We, from Rye, went back to Bawdsey to study coast defence and there met the redoubtable Admiral Sir James Somerville. He turned up one day with a tame submarine with a wireless set to control the same, and proceeded to spot it on the CD set. He nearly lost it to one of our bombers but fortunately it survived and he went away full of enthusiasm.

Somerville's own recording of the event is somewhat more circumspect:

Not very conclusive but Butement & Cockcroft quite optimistic. H.34 got bombarded at 1045 by one of our aircraft. Luckily no damage. Should have been obvious.

Work was aided by the arrival of a team of researchers from Cockcroft's Cavendish Laboratory at Cambridge University. They took it upon themselves to disassemble the Bawdsey unit and bring it to Cambridge, where Pye Radio engineers were brought in to begin producing copies.

=== Immediate deployment ===
On 14 October the Royal Navy suffered an enormously embarrassing setback when U-47 snuck into the harbour at Scapa Flow and sank the battleship HMS Royal Oak. This led to demands for an immediate deployment of the CD systems in the anti-submarine role, under the name CDU.

Three sets, one of these possibly being the Bawdsey prototype, were shipped north on 27 October 1939 in an emergency-speed deployment to Fair Isle and Sumburgh in the Shetland Islands. Days later it was realized that a required part had not made the voyage, and a Navy message asked for it to be delivered simply to "Cockcroft, Edinburgh". Hours of phone calls eventually solved the mystery of who this might be, and he quickly left with the needed part. Sumburgh was operational in the first week in December, but the conditions on Fair Isle were significantly more difficult. The first set was operational there on 16 February, and the second on the 23rd. All of these stations soon proved themselves highly valuable in detecting aircraft attacking the fleet.

In November 1939, the Air Ministry placed an emergency order for more CHL sets to counter German aircraft laying magnetic mines that were causing havoc on the east coast. The first two stations were installed at Foreness Point and Walton-on-Naze, which came online on 1 December and the 14th, respectively. Three more stations followed in early 1940, at Shotton, Happisburgh and Spurn Head.

Cockcroft introduced a new method of attacking enemy aircraft at Foreness. The CHL station would track a target while an air traffic controller would guide a night fighter toward the station's area such that it would fly into the radar beam. As the targets were flying up the Thames Estuary, this normally meant the fighter was directed to a point several miles north of Foreness. When the fighter entered the beam it became visible on the display along with the target, and from then a controller at the radar site took over radio control and directed the fighter left or right to stay centred in the beam while they continued to track the target. These experiments were successful, with Squadron Leader Pretty guiding the first interception, and soon led to the concept of dedicated ground controlled interception radars.

Real production models, as opposed to hand-built units, began to appear in December 1940. These were initially deployed mostly to the southeastern approaches, from Broadstairs in the north to Worthing in the southwest. A total of 120 units were built before production shut down in September 1941 in favour of new designs. As the chain expanded, the information being provided by the CD sites became highly valuable to the Navy as well, and reports from the CD sites were sent to both the Army and Navy plotting centres. By the start of 1941, the two systems were highly integrated.

=== Replacement ===
In March 1941, a delegation of Army visitors was invited to the Navy's research centre at Eastney Barracks to view the Navy's new Type 271 radar. Based on the cavity magnetron, it operated at a wavelength of only 9.1 cm, allowing it to be much more tightly focussed from much smaller antennas.

The Navy had the problem that their ships rolled in the waves, so a tightly focused pencil beam was not appropriate, at least not without using a stabilization system. Instead, they took advantage of the fact that radio waves reflected forward off the water, and only returned a signal if something rose vertically off the surface. Instead of scanning close to the horizon, they used a "cheese" antenna that deliberately spread out the signal vertically, with most of it either going into the sky or reflecting away off the water. Only the small portion near the horizon could be properly reflected back to the antenna, and the large vertical sides of their targets gave them good returns even from the spread out signal.

The Army did not have to worry about rolling in the waves, so they selected a parabolic reflector instead. The tight pencil beam allowed it to be scanned much more closely to the horizon than Mark I without seeing reflections off local landforms and shoals, which had rendered CD Mark I useless in some locations. These antennas also greatly increased gain, allowing them to see small boats as far away as right against the French coastline. Two such reflectors, one each for transmission and reception, were attached to the top of a vertical pole which could be rotated to scan. In contrast to the earlier CD system, rotation of this system was powered by a motor, reducing the number of people needed to run the station.

The system offered much higher resolution and range accuracy than the existing VHF sets could achieve, and those Mark I sets that had been set aside for CA use were instead rebuilt using the new equipment. None of the original CA sets were ever released to service. Those stations with the original equipment were given station numbers with a leading "M", whilst those with the newer systems were labelled with a "K".

=== Channel dash ===
The network of Mark I stations was well developed and the first microwave sets just arriving on 12 February 1942 when the Channel Dash occurred. The Germans implemented an extremely sophisticated radar jamming operation that rendered all of the Mark I sets almost useless, leaving the job to the few microwave sets. The K station at Ventnor was out of action due to a small fire the night before. The K.7 station at Fairlight picked them up, but the telephone line to CA plotting HQ had not been installed. They managed to forward their observations via Newhaven, but this reached the plotting centre at the same time as the first indications from microwave sets in Dover. In the end, the Mark I sets contributed nothing to the effort.

== Description ==
The CD system used separate aerials for transmission and reception, the receiver just off the ground and the transmitter typically at the top of a large steel trusswork tower. Those sites that operated as both CD and CHL were on towers up to 240 feet (73 m) tall, but CD-only sites were generally much shorter.

The antennas themselves consisted of a series of dipoles placed a quarter wavelength in front of a steel framework similar to scaffolding. The frameworks were formed into several squares and then bolted to each other to form a large rectangle, and a series of cables was strung across the face, behind the dipoles, forming a reflector. The antennas were mounted on bearings that allowed them to be rotated to scan the horizon, manually powered using a long bicycle chain attached to a stationary bicycle at the base of the antenna tower. It was joked that one could immediately identify the WAAFs who performed this duty by looking for their muscular legs.

The A-scope-type display was drawn upward instead of across as in Chain Home. The receiver was connected to a switch that alternated between two sets of dipoles on the antenna, with one of them being electrically inverted on reception. The result was a line running vertically down the centre of the display with blips appearing as short horizontal lines indicating reflections. The range to the target could be measured against a scale on display, and the angle between the antenna and the target by comparing the length of the blip on either side of the centre and rotating the antenna until the two were equal.

In the CA role all that changed was the addition of the specialized ranging display, while the original CD display was used to measure the angle and make an initial estimate of range. On the new display, the return signal was not drawn up the centre of the display, but in a spiral around it. The distance to the target was measured using a rotating straightedge and measured against a scale on the outside of the display. When shots hit the water, the operator would see additional blips appear near the targets, and then use a second straightedge with a built-in scale to measure that angle. They would then read the difference in range off this smaller scale.

=== Versions ===
Gough mentions three versions of the original 1.5 m set, Mark I, II and III. Any differences between them are not mentioned. Sayer does not mention any set except the original Mark I, but does state that the microwave sets started at Mark IV.
