= Spur Battery =

Artillery battery in Gibraltar

- Part of Fortifications of Gibraltar
- Upper Rock Nature Reserve, Gibraltar
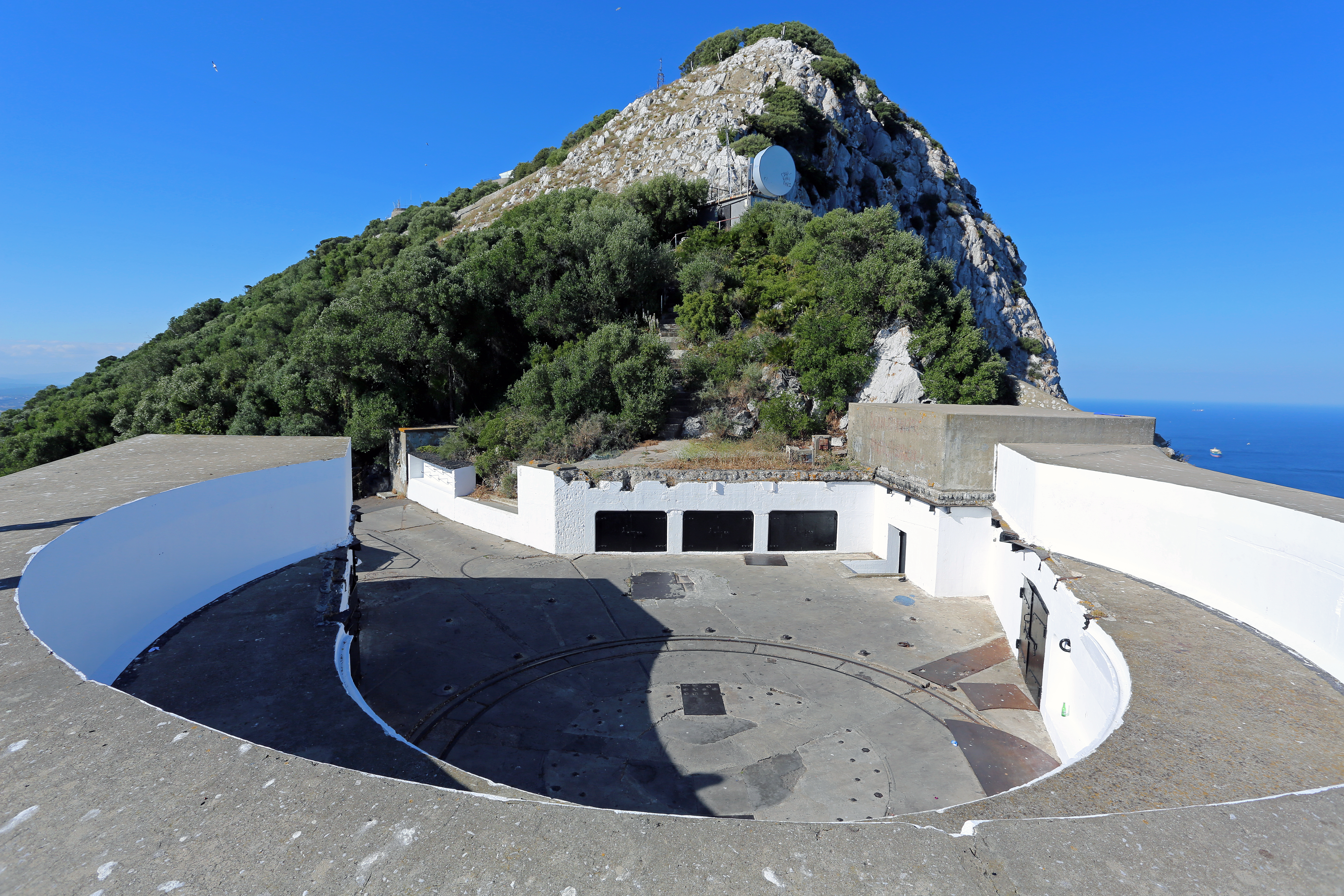
- Spur Battery in Gibraltar after 1981, tracks for shell trolleys visible

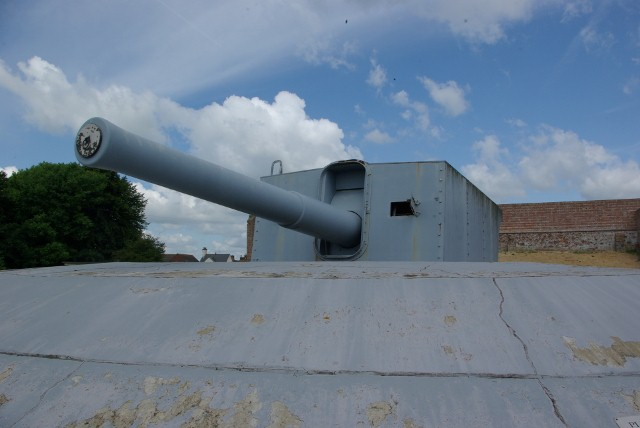
- The 9.2-inch Mark X coastal defence gun at the Imperial War Museum in Duxford after it was transferred from Spur Battery

Site information
- Type: Artillery battery
- Condition: Poor

Location
- Location of Spur Battery in Gibraltar
- Location within Gibraltar
- Coordinates: 36.122713°N 5.343892°W

Site history
- Built: 1902
- In use: Decommissioned; Gun transferred to Imperial War Museum Duxford in 1981

Spur Battery is an artillery battery in the British Overseas Territory of Gibraltar. It is located in the Upper Battery area of the southern end of the Upper Rock Nature Reserve, just southwest of O'Hara's Battery. A 9.2-inch Mark X breech-loading gun was mounted on the emplacement in 1902, with improvements made to the battery after World War I. In 1981 the 9.2-inch gun at Spur Battery was dismantled and transferred to the Imperial War Museum in Duxford, England, for preservation. The operation was known as Project Vitello.

== Early history ==
Spur Battery is in Gibraltar, the British Overseas Territory at the southern end of the Iberian Peninsula. The artillery battery is located near the southern end of the Upper Rock Nature Reserve, in the Upper Battery area, which also includes O'Hara's Battery and Lord Airey's Battery. It is positioned at the southern terminus of Spur Battery Road, just southwest of O'Hara's Battery, at an elevation of 1,130 ft above sea level. Its name was based on its location on St. George's Spur.

The mounting of 9.2-inch guns on Gibraltar's artillery batteries began in the 1890s. By 1914, Gibraltar boasted fourteen of those guns on twelve batteries. The 9.2-inch Mark X breech-loading gun at Spur Battery was installed in 1902. It was used in World War I on 31 December 1915, when German submarines were positioned off the coast of Gibraltar. Three rounds were fired from the gun, with another ten rounds fired from other 9.2-inch guns of the South Fire Command. The outcome was recorded in a journal as: "Result of action. One target disappeared, and a large explosion took place at another."

The gun barrel at Spur Battery was upgraded after World War I. In addition, its mount was changed from a Mark V to a Mark VII in 1935. This entailed increasing the armour and modernising the control system, and resulted in improvement of loading, elevation, and traverse. The specifications of the weapon included a combined weight for the gun and its mounting of 204 tons, with the weight of the barrel 28 tons. Each shell weighed 380 lbs; individual charges were 109 lbs. The 9.2-inch gun had a muzzle velocity of 2,700 ft/sec and fired 2–3 rounds/minute. The range of the gun was 29,600 yds. This easily covered both the Strait of Gibraltar and the Bay of Gibraltar, the distances across those bodies of water measuring 25,500 yds and 9,000 yds, respectively.

== Recent history ==
In the 1970s, the Royal Gibraltar Regiment fired the coastal defence gun at Spur Battery for the last time. The 9.2-inch gun fired 29 rounds at a towed target that day, and made its mark several times. The other guns of the Upper Battery area also fired for the last time then.

In 1981, the gun at Spur Battery on the Upper Rock Nature Reserve was dismantled and transported to the Imperial War Museum at Duxford, England for preservation. The operation was entitled Project Vitello, and it was undertaken in two phases. The first phase was referred to as Project Vitello 1 and entailed the dismantling of the gun at Spur Battery and its transfer to the Gibraltar dockyard. This was performed in early 1981. The second phase, Project Vitello 2, started in August 1981, when the 9.2-inch gun arrived in Portsmouth. The transfer to Duxford was accomplished in eleven loads. The construction necessary at the museum began in September 1981 and was completed in early 1982. The Royal Engineers were responsible for completing both phases of Project Vitello. The gun was replaced with Exocet guided missile systems. {Dead Link}

Following removal of its 9.2-inch gun, Spur Battery sustained vandalism. The magazine and other chambers of the lower level have been emptied of equipment or sealed off. Not only the gun was removed, but also the gun mount enclosure. Subsequently, the cartridge storage areas are now exposed and have undergone corrosion.

== Gallery ==
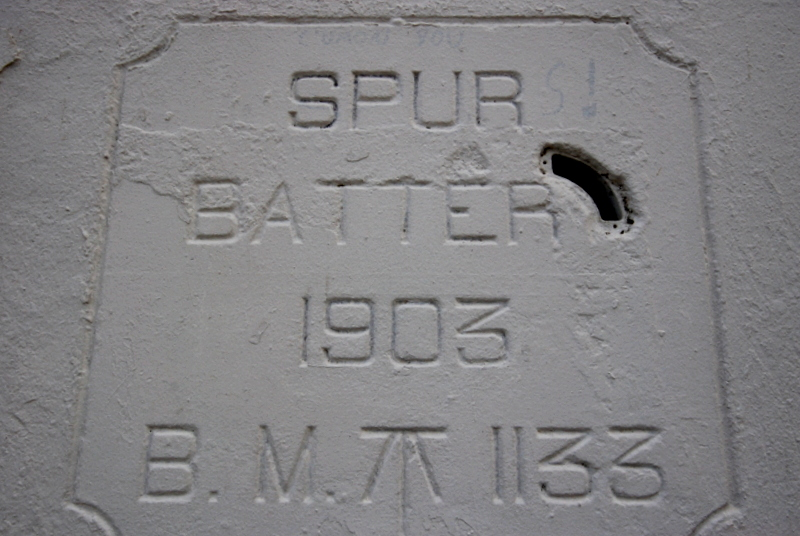
Plaque at Spur Battery indicates date of 1903

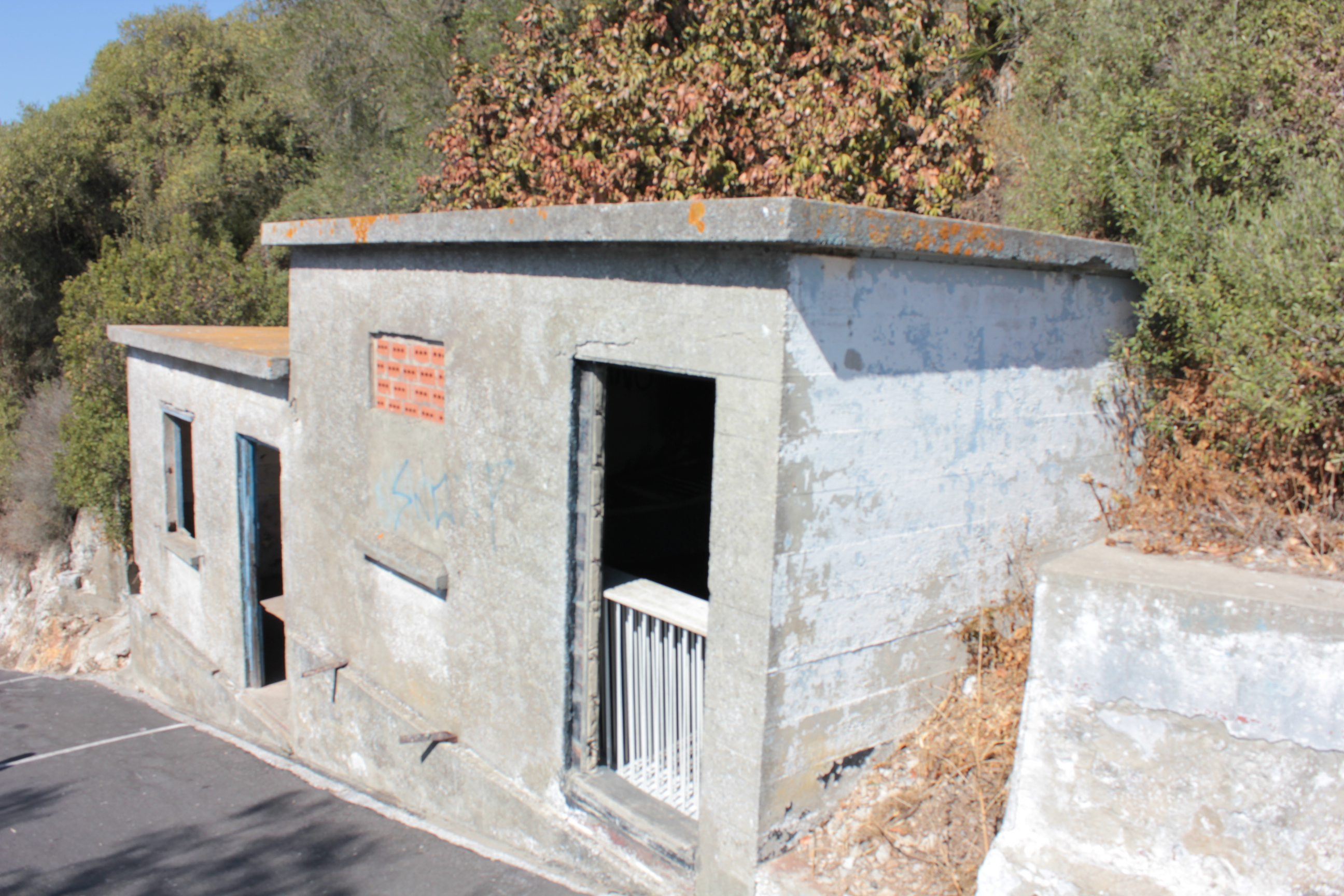
Buildings at entrance to Spur Battery

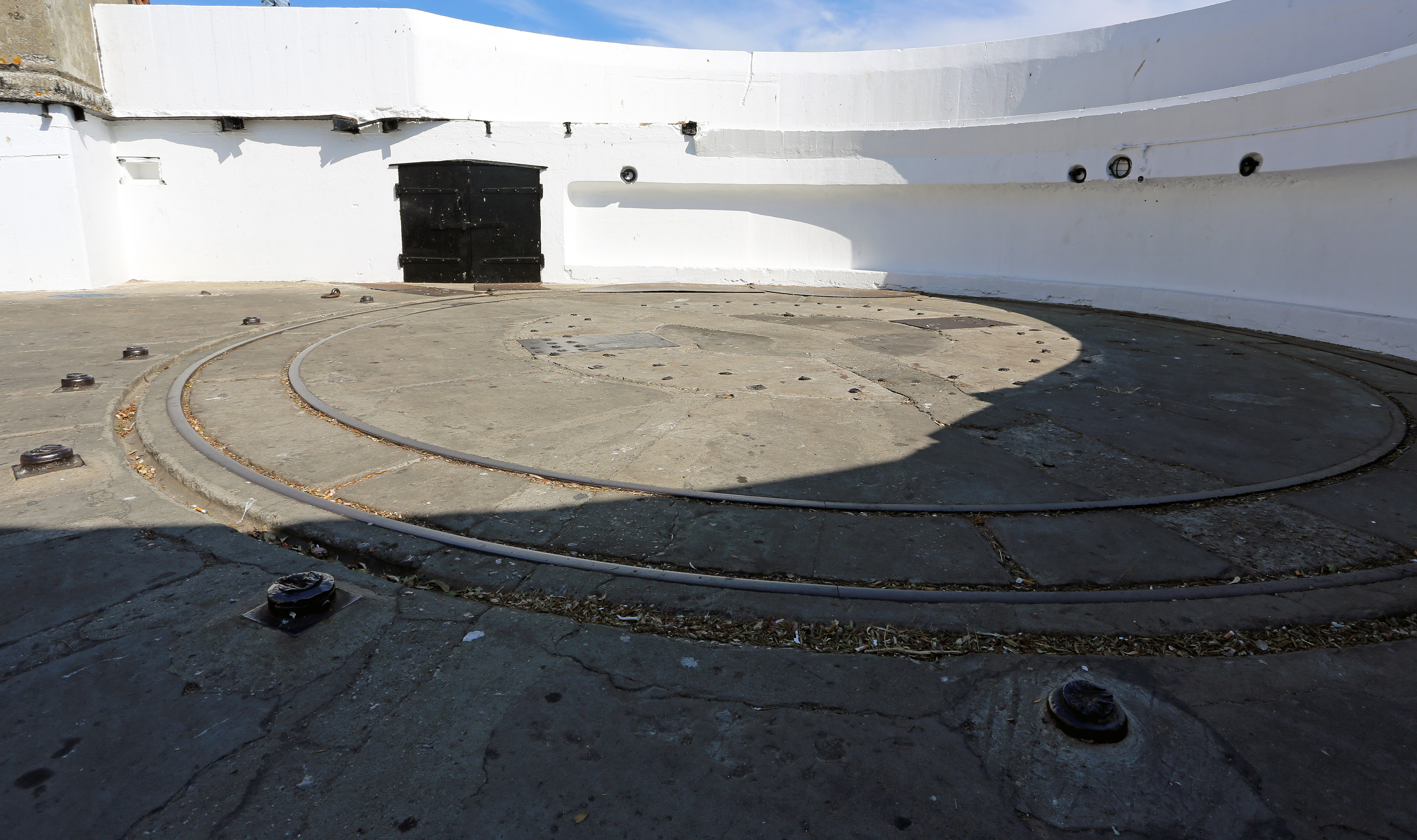
Former site of gun, with shell trolley tracks

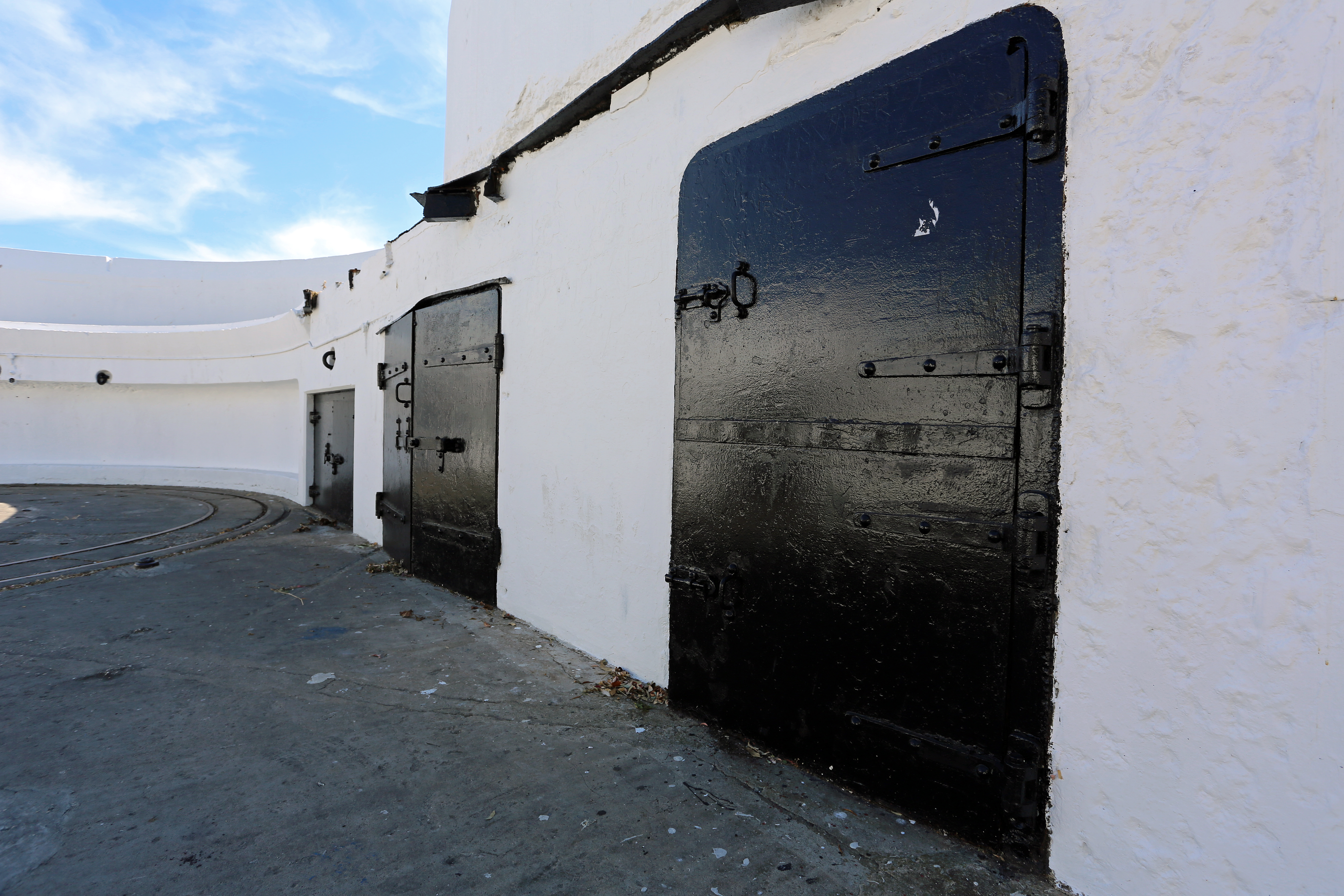
Storage Facilities at Spur Battery

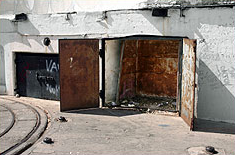
Spur Battery cartridge storage areas

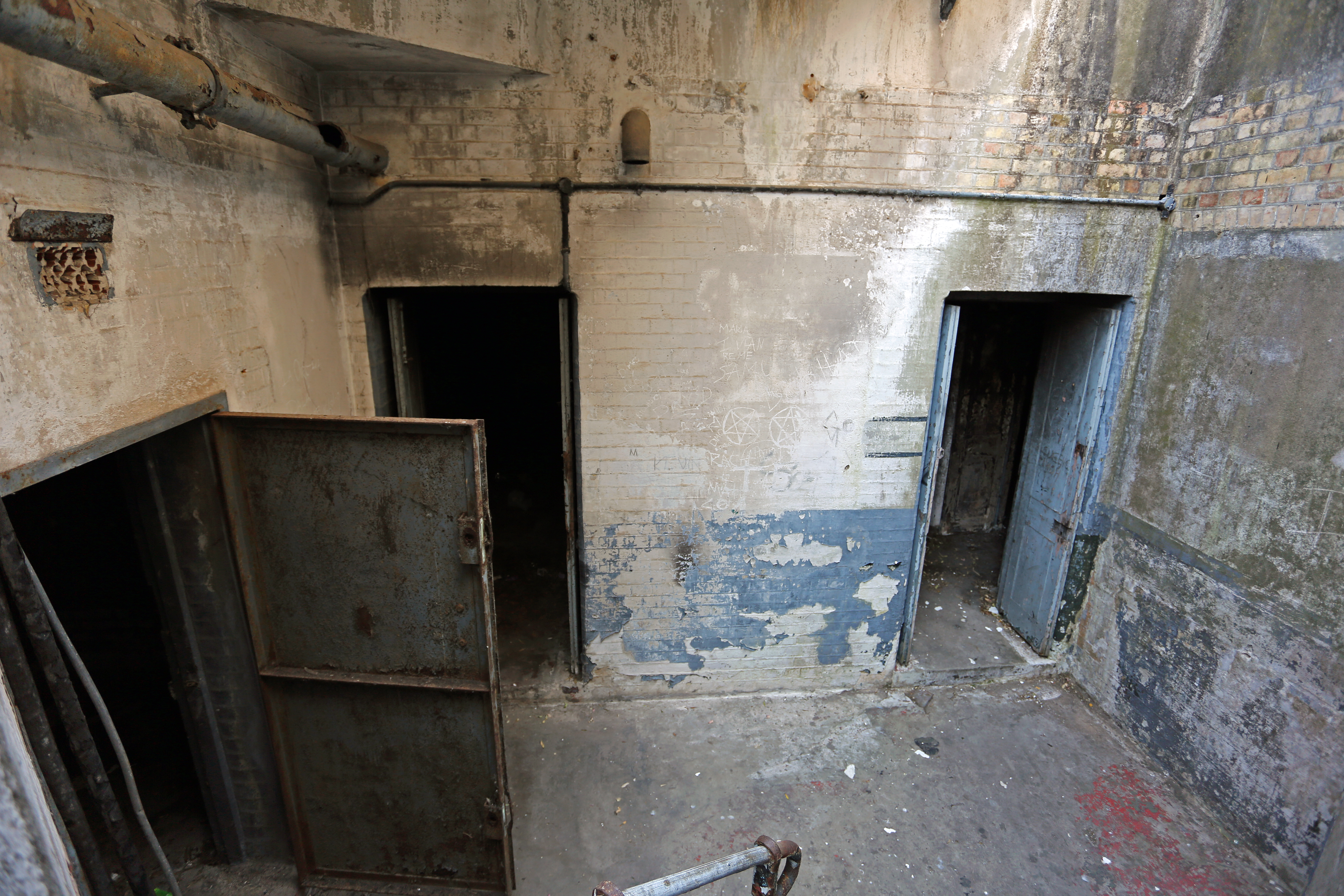
Inside the doors lead off

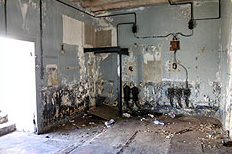
Spur Battery upper level, evidence of electrical
