= Fort Banks =

Fort Banks may refer to:

- Fort Banks (Australia)
- Fort Banks (Massachusetts)
