= Project Vitello =

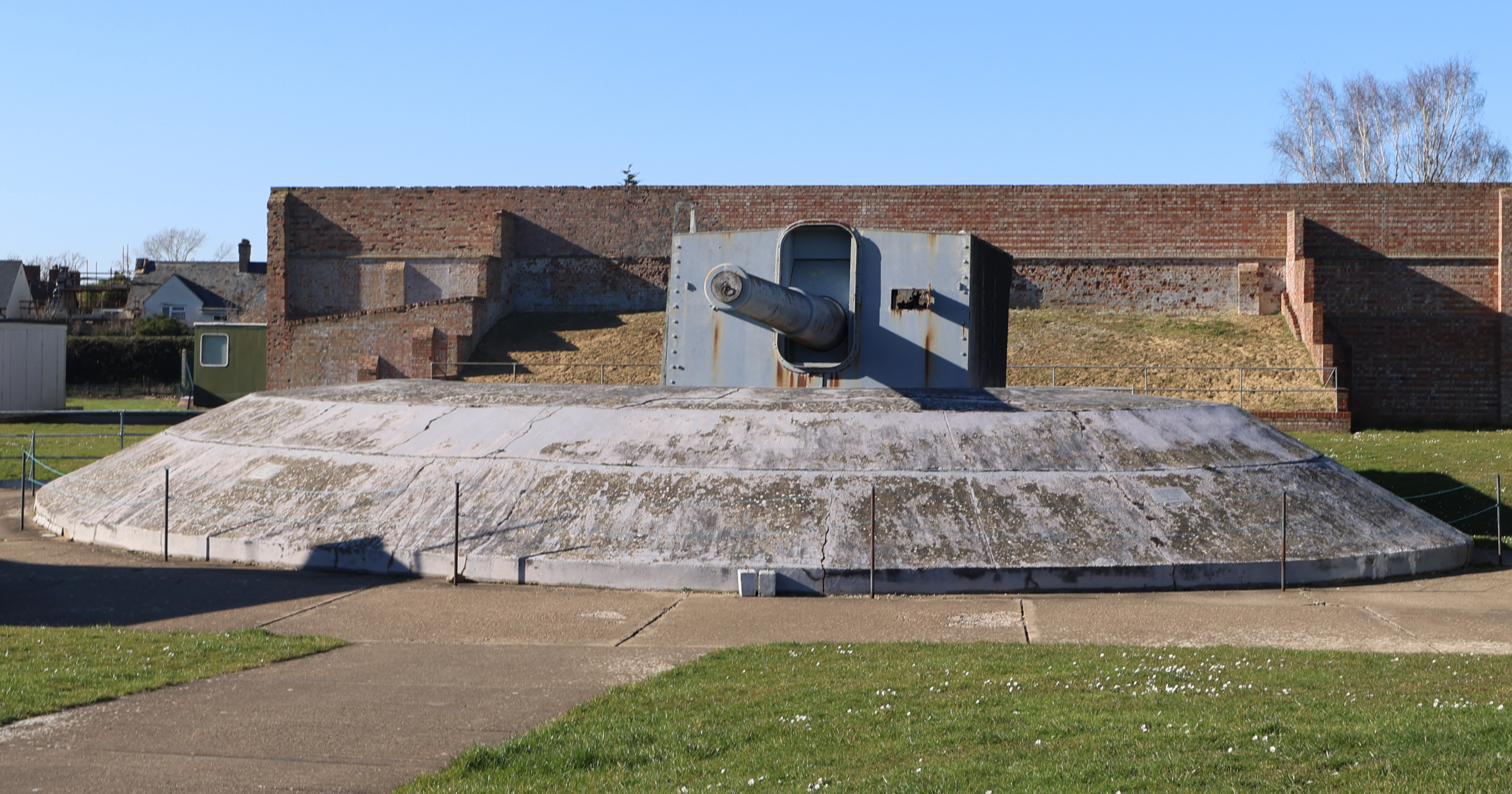
- Location: Gibraltar to Portsmouth to Duxford, Cambridgeshire, England
- Objective: Military transfer of gun from Spur Battery in Gibraltar to Imperial War Museum Duxford in England
- Date: 1981
- Executed by: 1982

Project Vitello was a military operation that transferred the 9.2-inch Mark X breech-loading gun at Spur Battery in the British Overseas Territory of Gibraltar to the Imperial War Museum in Duxford, Cambridgeshire, England. Project Vitello I, the first phase, entailed the dismantling of the gun by the Royal Engineers at the artillery battery and transporting it to the Gibraltar dockyard in 1981. It was then shipped to Portsmouth on a Royal Fleet Auxiliary vessel. Project Vitello II, the second phase, began with the arrival of the gun in Portsmouth and involved transporting the gun to the Duxford Aerodrome. The Royal Engineers not only reassembled the gun and its mount, but also constructed a base, shell pit, and parapet, with the operation completed in 1982. The Gibraltar Gun was inaugurated that year by Sir John Grandy, Chairman of the Trustees of the Imperial War Museum.

== History ==
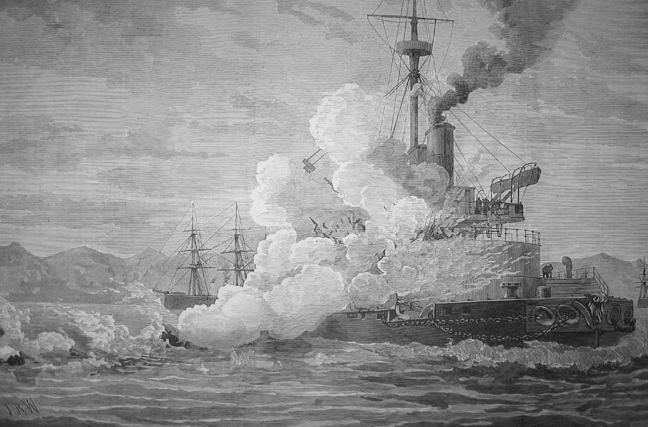
HMS Thunderer (1872), 2 January 1879, explosion of a muzzle-loading gun

The 9.2-inch Mark X breech-loading gun (pictured above) on display at the Imperial War Museum at Duxford Aerodrome in England originated at Spur Battery in the British Overseas Territory of Gibraltar. By 1914, more than one hundred of the guns had been installed at emplacements in strategic areas across the British Empire. However, by 1981, Gibraltar's 9.2-inch guns were the only remnants of a weapon that had at one time been mounted on numerous artillery batteries. [Two more 9.2 inch Mk X guns survive at Oliver's Battery, on Rottnest Island, Western Australia. As of 2012, one has been restored, the other is still awaiting restoration.] The Imperial War Museum's decision to preserve one of the weapons was based on its symbolism of Britain's links to Gibraltar since the turn of the eighteenth century, as well as its former status as the United Kingdom's most important gun for coastal defence.

Following the explosion of one of the 38-ton guns aboard HMS Thunderer (1872) on 2 January 1879, a Committee on Ordnance was established to evaluate the United Kingdom's artillery and its future. The committee was to consider "the question of breech-loading guns and such other questions as may be brought before it." The British Admiralty wanted a gun similar to one that was manufactured by Friedrich Krupp AG in Essen, Germany. The rifled breech-loading gun that resulted was an improvement over traditional rifled muzzle-loading weapons. The 9.2-inch breech-loading weapon was initially a naval gun, but was selected for use in coastal defence, the purpose of which was protection of naval bases, harbours, and ports, as well as prevention of invasion. In the late nineteenth century, torpedo boats and larger enemy vessels clad in iron posed a major threat to coastal countries, including those of the British Empire. Smaller guns were mounted to handle torpedo boats. However, the 9.2-inch guns were selected to deal with hostile warships and their long-range attacks. While the weapons on warships were more powerful, coastal defence positions had the advantage of firing from a stable base. The 9.2-inch gun retained its importance in British coastal defence for more than fifty years, until the mid-twentieth century. However, in 1956, Coast Defence was eliminated as a separate branch of the military. Although the 9.2-inch guns were still the primary coastal defence weapon, the decision had been made that planes and guided missiles were more effective in addressing invasion of a country or long-range attacks.

== Project Vitello I ==
The first phase of the project to transfer the 9.2-inch gun at Spur Battery in Gibraltar to the Imperial War Museum in Duxford, Cambridgeshire was entitled Project Vitello I. It encompassed the dismantling of the gun at the battery and its transport to the Gibraltar dockyard. The Royal Engineers began the operation in the Spring of 1981. The 61 Field Support Squadron of the 36 Engineer Regiment found that access to the battery was somewhat difficult. There were space restrictions around the 9.2-inch gun, and the primary components of the gun had to be disassembled utilising traditional means. The total weight of the gun and its associated components was 140 tons, which then had to be driven down Gibraltar's roads, manoeuvring hairpin turns and a steep grade, to the Gibraltar dockyard. The operation was extremely hazardous. The barrel alone weighed 28 tons and was 37 feet long. It was brought down from Spur Battery using the Royal Navy's AEC Mandator and Scammel 6x6 heavy haulage locomotive with a swan-neck trailer. Add in the precipitous nature of the roads some 500 feet above the town and you will get some idea of the challenge and risks involved. Mr Clifford Ball, head of the Royal Navy MT Workshop and senior Ministry of Defence automotive engineer on the Rock acted as technical advisor to the Royal Engineers. He also carried out a range calculations to establish the suitability and safety of the vehicles involved. The dismantling of the gun at Spur Battery was recorded, originally on Super 8 mm film. Now on 16 mm film, the footage, entitled Gibraltar's 9.2 Inch Gun, is maintained by the Imperial War Museum at Duxford.

== Project Vitello II ==
The second phase of the operation was entitled Project Vitello II. It commenced in August 1981 with the arrival of the gun at Portsmouth on RFA Bacchus (A404) (link to photograph below). The gun was transported to Duxford in eleven separate loads by the 56 Motor Transport (Training) Squadron of the Royal Engineers. The Engineers' 34 Field Squadron of the 39 Engineer Regiment then reassembled the 9.2-inch gun at the Duxford Aerodrome. This was undertaken in several phases. At the site of the previous rifle range on the aerodrome, 34 Field Squadron built a concrete base in September 1981. Over a period of five weeks in November to December 1981, the squadron reassembled the 9.2-inch gun on the concrete plinth. The following year, in February 1982, a parapet was built in front of the weapon, as well as a shell pit beneath. The construction performed by the squadron was intended to give an appearance similar to that encountered at Spur Battery in Gibraltar. The gun is displayed between Buildings 177 and 178, adjacent to the American Air Museum.

== Inauguration ==
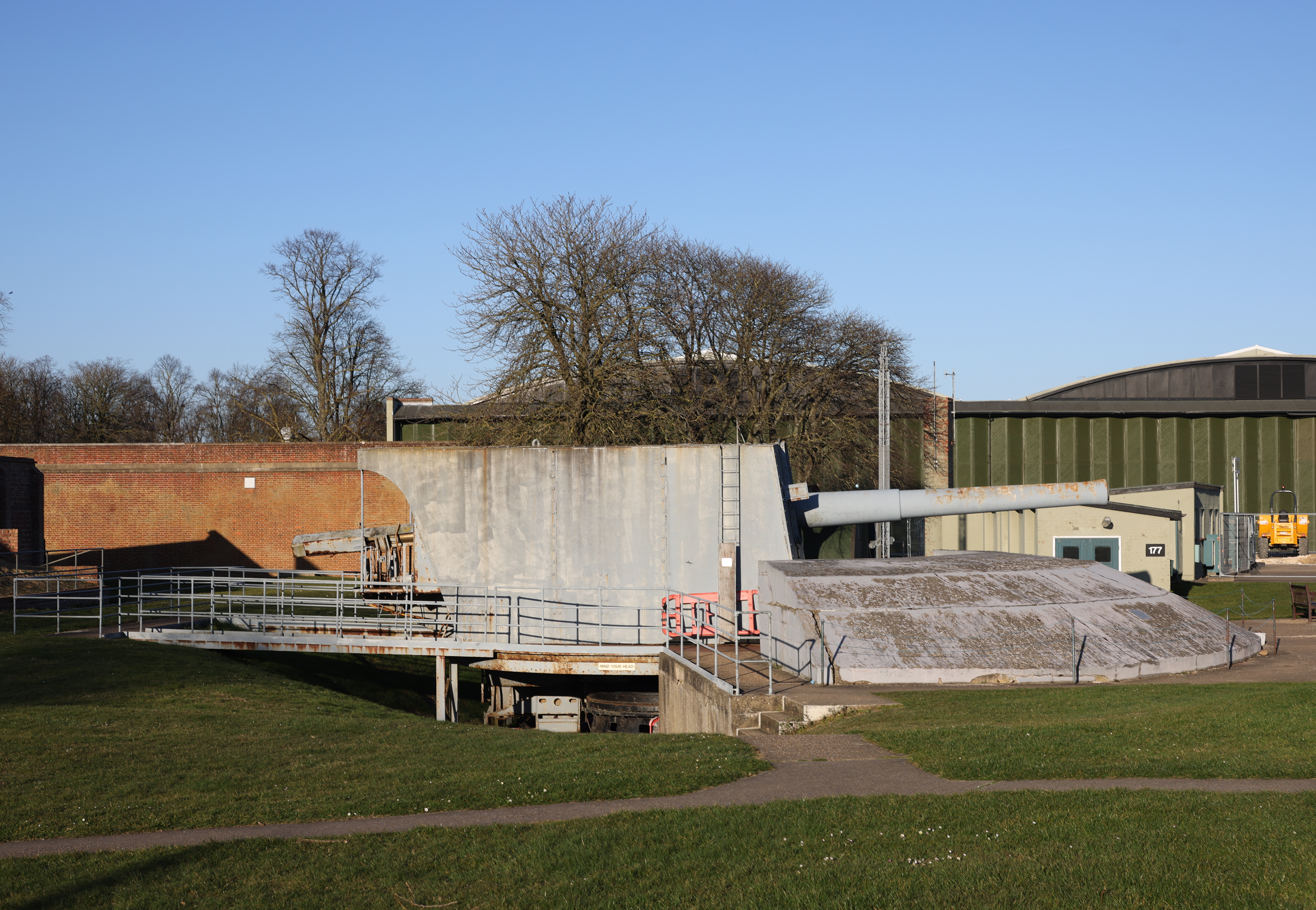
Side view of gun and mount

On 4 June 1982, Sir John Grandy (1913 – 2004) dedicated the display of the 9.2-inch gun, which in England is also referred to as the Gibraltar Gun. Grandy, Marshall of the Royal Air Force, had been the commanding officer at Duxford in 1942. After more than two and a half decades of leadership posts, Grandy became Chief of the Air Staff on 1 April 1967, the 49th anniversary of the founding of the Royal Air Force. Following his retirement in 1971, he served as Commander-in-chief and Governor of Gibraltar from 1973 to 1978. It represented the first time that an RAF officer filled that position. Grandy was Chairman of the Trustees of the Imperial War Museum from 1978 to 1989.
