= Brackenbury Battery =

Artillery battery in Suffolk, England

Coordinates: 51.968707°N 1.3731283°E

Brackenbury Battery was a small coastal artillery fort located just north of Felixstowe, England, and initially known as Felixstowe Battery. It opened in October 1915 to provide fire northward from the Haven ports, replacing a battery of 10-inch guns that had previously covered this area. With their removal, only a single 10-inch gun in Landguard Fort could fire in that direction, and Brackenbury was built to address this problem.

Brackenbury Battery was equipped with two of the newest 9.2-inch Mk IX guns, making it the most powerfully armed battery on the east coast at that time. The gun's carriages were set in concrete with shelters below, then surrounded by an earthen rampart and ditch. The guns were upgraded to Mk. X versions in 1929-1930. Trenches and strongpoints were added around the battery on the outbreak of World War II, and in 1941 two searchlights were placed on the beach to give the battery night fighting capability.

The Battery had a role in the development of radar when, in July 1939, the guns were being test fired right as researchers at Bawdsey Manor, about 1 mile (1.6 km) to the north, were testing a new surface-scanning radar. The splashes of the shells produced strong returns on the radar displays, allowing the team to measure the distance and bearing of the fall of shot. This led to the development of Coast Artillery radar, and more generally the use of radar to guide naval gunfire.

During WWII, the battery was manned by the 176 Battery of Suffolk Heavy Regiment Royal Artillery (Territorial Army), and later, 278 Battery of 515 Coast Regiment. It was put into care and maintenance in 1944, and formally stood down in 1952. The site was later redeveloped as a housing estate, and the area is now a greenspace. No sign of the battery remains.
