= Fort Banks (Australia) =

Coordinates: 33.9947°S 151.2499°E

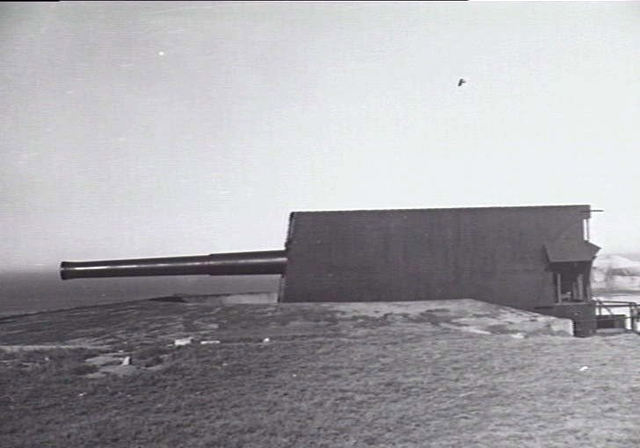
One of the 9.2 inch guns in May 1946

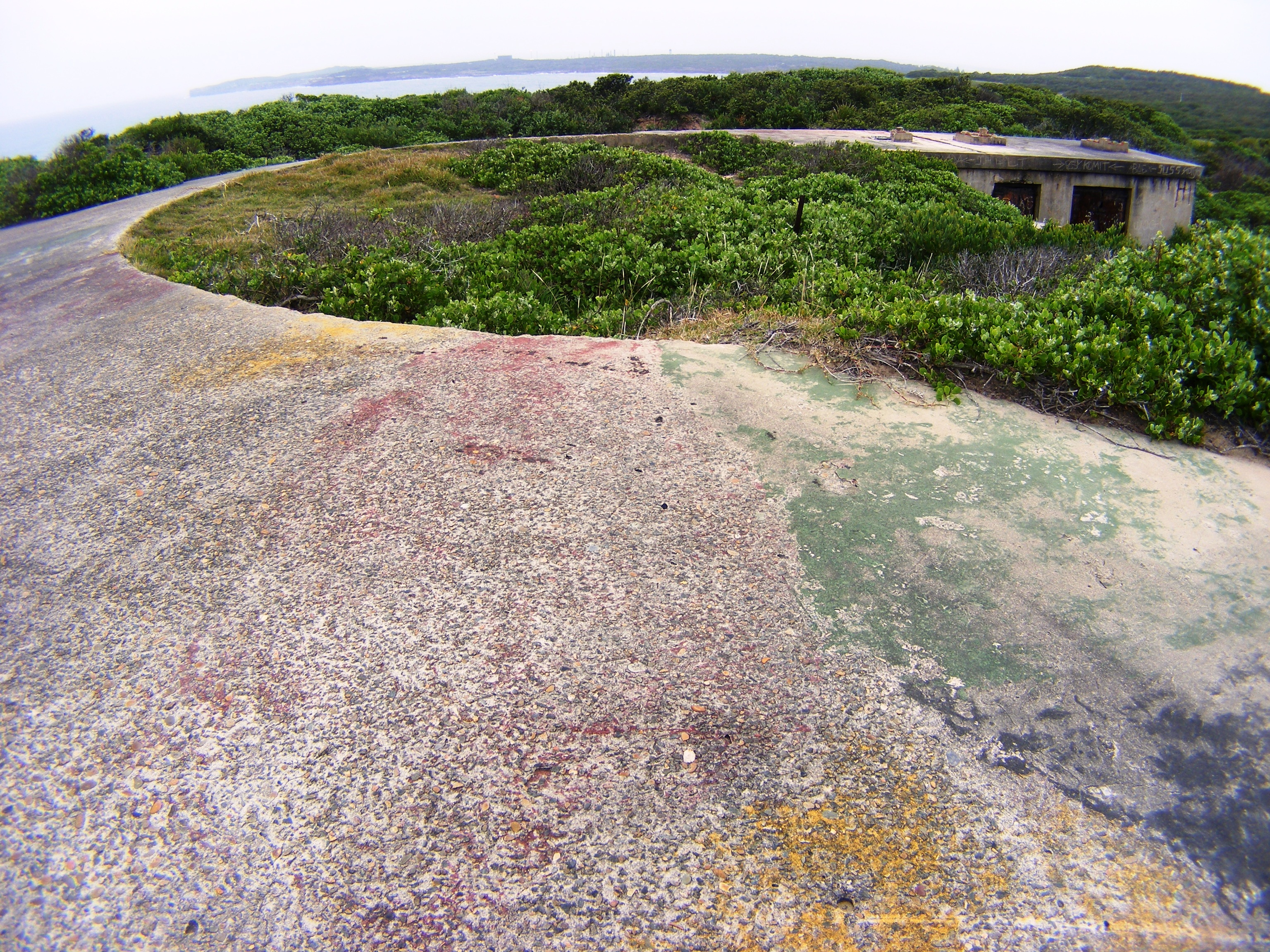
The same site as of 2008

Fort Banks (Eastern Command Fixed Defences) is an old World War II bunker and fortification complex that was used to protect the approaches to Botany Bay. The fortification is located north of Cape Banks in La Perouse, New South Wales, Australia.

== History ==
Prior to World War II a portion of the land located on Cape Banks that belongs to the New South Wales Golf Club was utilized by the Australian Defence Forces for the construction of the Cape Banks Battery. This was part of the Sydney Coastal Defences built prior to & during World War II. The counter bombardment fortifications consisted of two breech loading 9.2 inch gun emplacements, underground plotting room, underground powder & shell magazine, hydraulic pump room, & some short tunnels linking the different sections. During this period the Henry Head Battery which was built much earlier was also re-utilized as a local defence post, to stop landing parties from landing at La Perouse to attack Cape Banks, and to deal with torpedo boat attack on Port Botany, and consisted of two breech loading 6 inch guns when built, but removed by 1910, but by World War II was armed with two 18pdr field guns, on pedestals, in newly built concrete emplacements.

== Image gallery ==
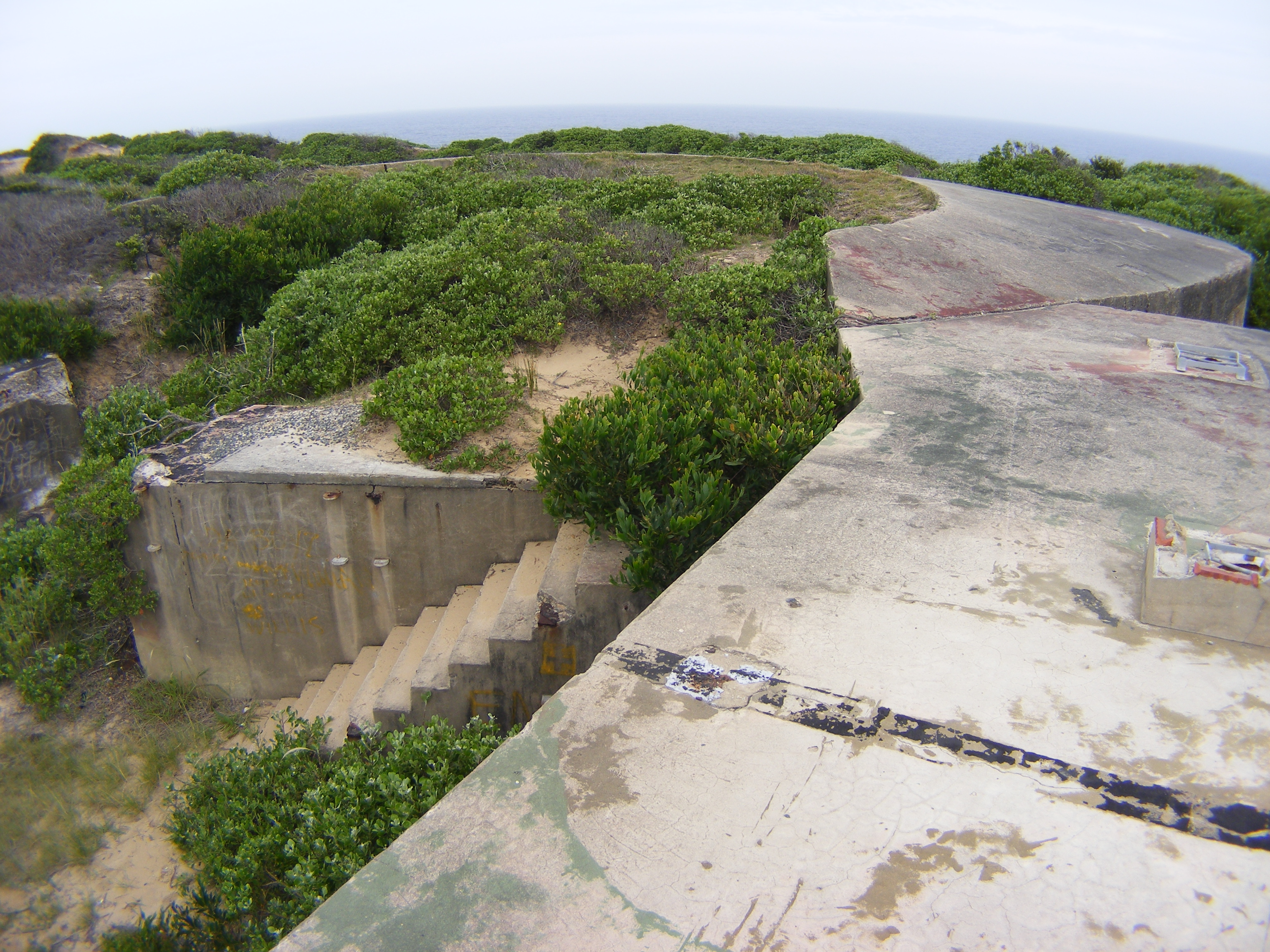
A partially buried gun emplacement that formed part of Fort Banks

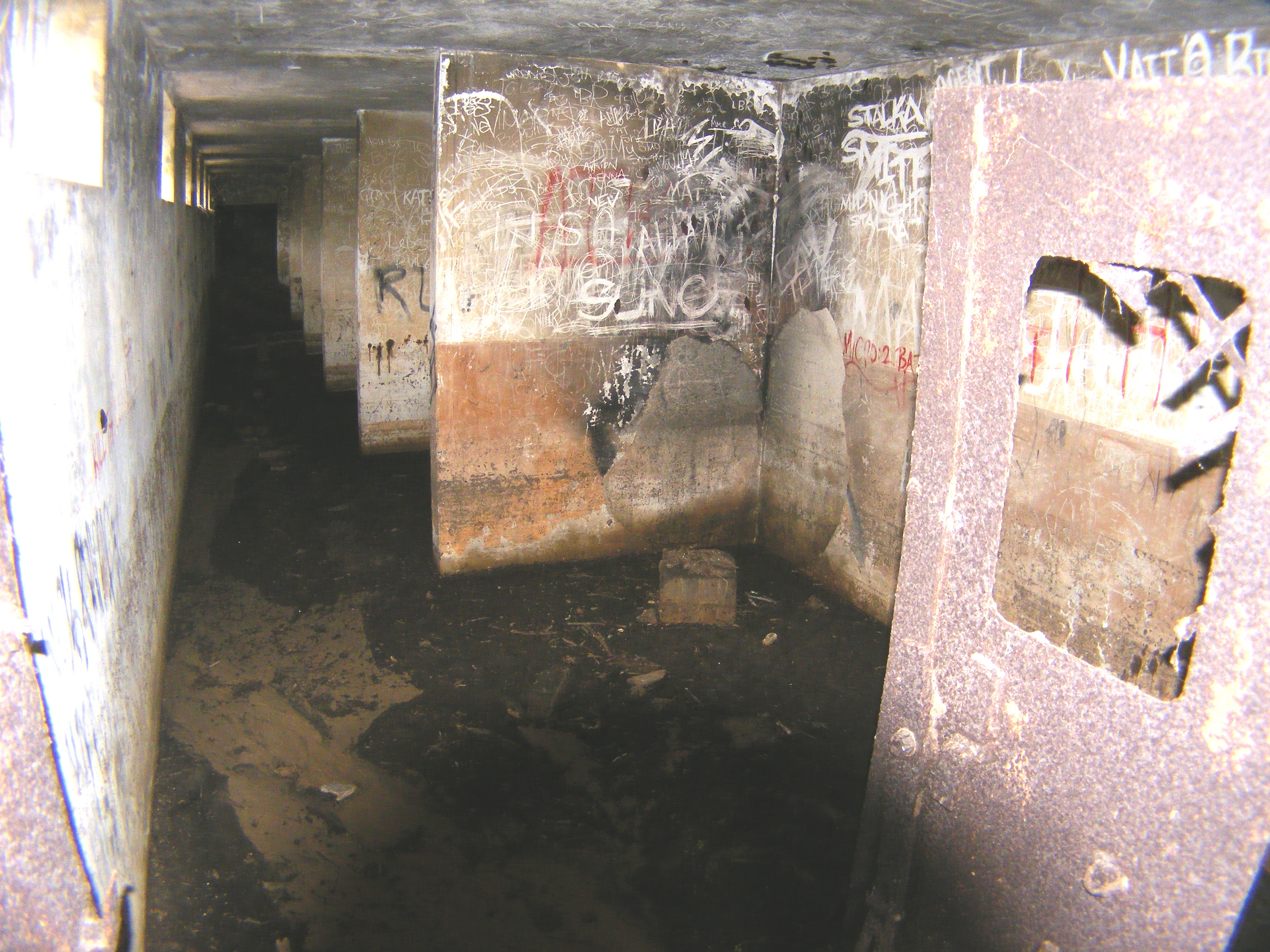
Inside the first aid post.
