= Themeda grassland =

Grassland community in southeastern Australia

Themeda grassland on seacliffs and headlands
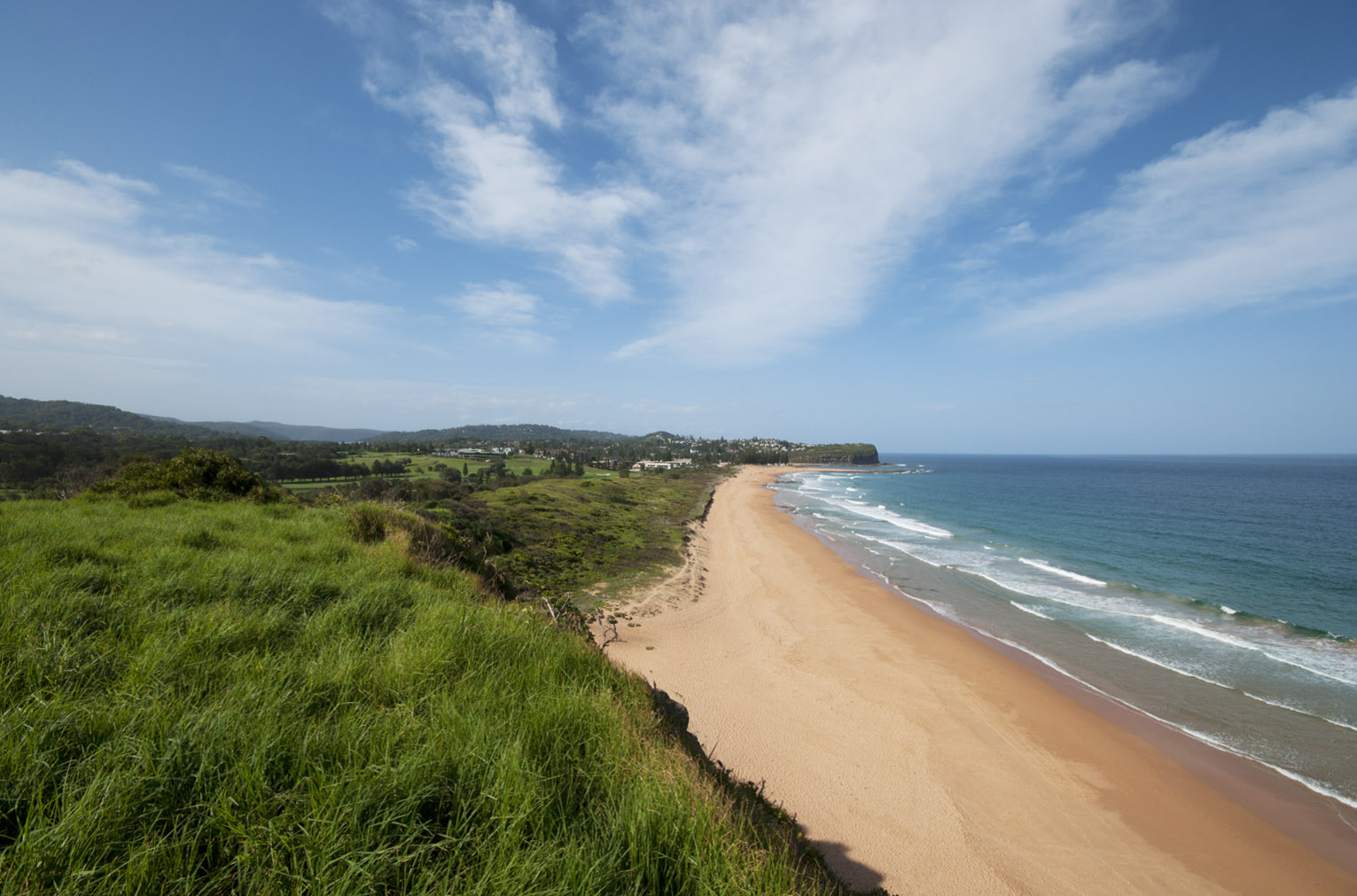

Ecology
- Realm: Australasia
- Biome: Temperate grasslands, savannas, and shrublands
- Borders: Eastern Suburbs Banksia Scrub

Geography
- Area: 1.46 km^{2} (0.56 sq mi)
- Country: Australia
- Elevation: 20–70 metres (66–230 ft)
- Coordinates: 33°44′30″S 151°18′55″E
- Geology: Sandstone, shale
- Climate type: Humid subtropical climate (Cfa); Oceanic climate (Cfb)
- Soil types: Sand

Themeda grassland, or Themeda grassland on seacliffs and headlands, is an endangered tussock-grassland that is found on the immediate coast in southeastern Australia, which may also be an open shrubland or heathland with a grassy enclosure between shrubs.

== Vegetation ==
Themeda australis is the predominant grass species in the area with interspersed shrubs such as Pimelea linifolia, Banksia integrifolia, Hibbertia vestita, Pultenaea maritima, Westringia fruticosa, Acacia sophorae and Acacia myrtifolia, with some having dwarf forms.

Grasses such as Zoysia macarantha and Cynodon dactylon can also be found. Poa poiformis is mostly present closer to the sea. Herbs include the creeping Polymeria calycina, the succulent Apium prostratum, Senecio pinnatifolius subsp. pinnatifolius and Xerochrysum bracteatum.

== Range ==
The ecological community is observed in the NSW North Coast, Sydney Basin and South East Corner bioregion on ancient sand dunes above cliffs. The community is most prominently found in Long Reef Headland, Narrabeen Headland, Botany Bay National Park, Turimetta Headland and Mona Vale Headland.

== See also ==
- Eastern Suburbs Banksia Scrub
