= Bindweed =

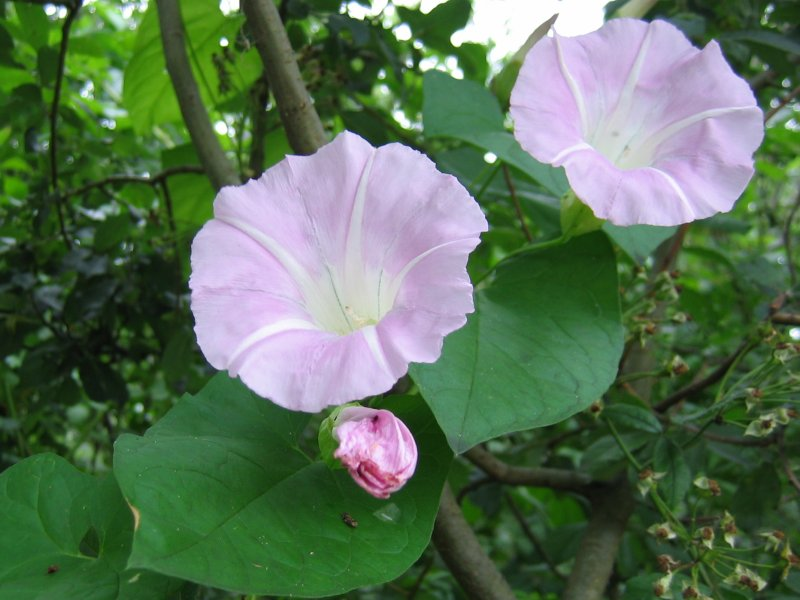
Calystegia pulchra

Bindweed may refer to:

- Some species of Convolvulaceae (bindweed family or morning glory family):
  - Calystegia (bindweed, false bindweed, morning glory), a genus of about 25 species of flowering plants
  - Convolvulus (bindweed, morning glory), a genus of about 250 species of flowering plants
  - Polymeria calycina, slender bindweed, native to Australia
- Dioscorea communis, black bindweed
- Fallopia convolvulus, black bindweed, a fast-growing annual flowering plant
- Solanum dulcamara, blue bindweed
