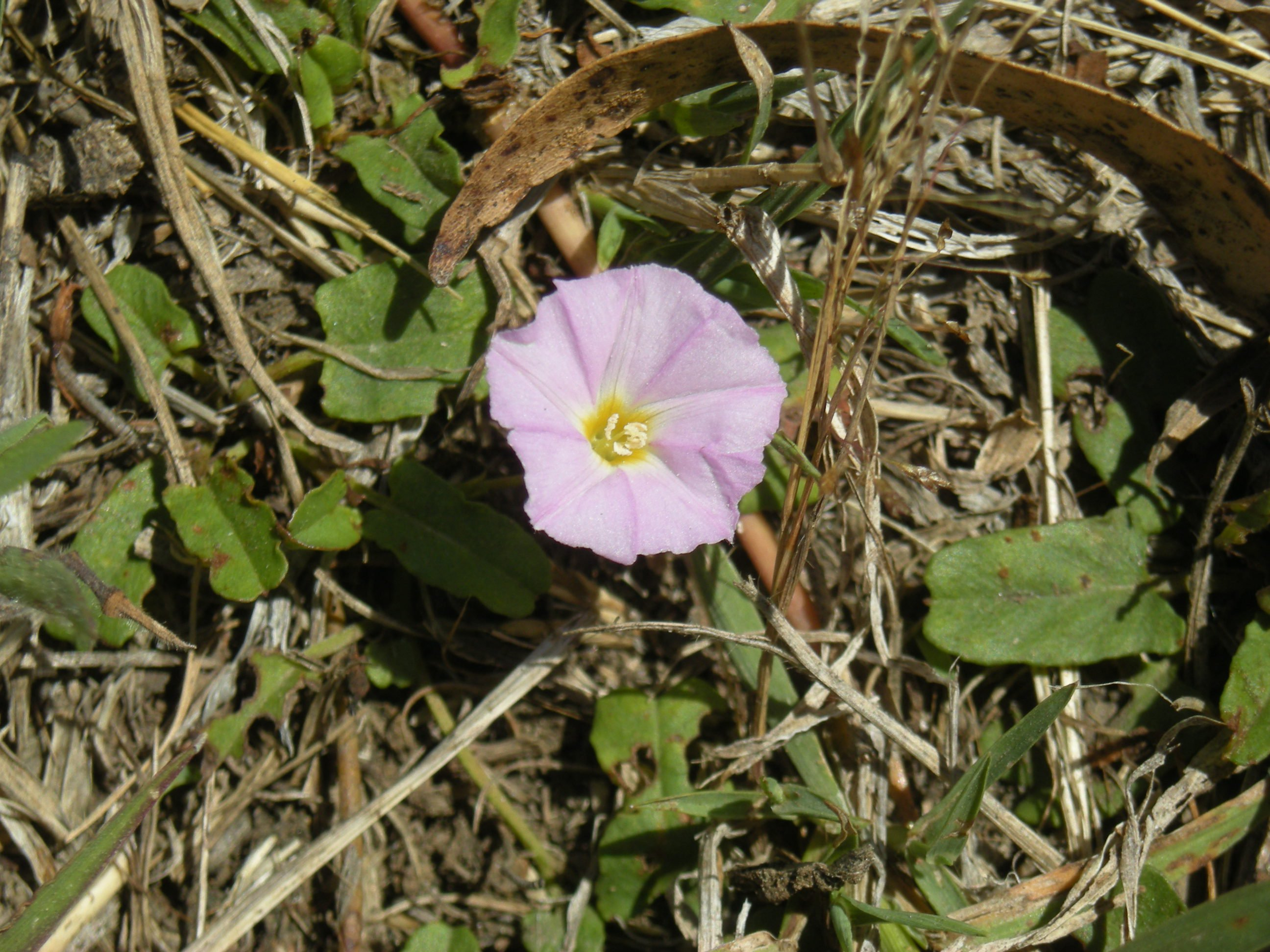
- Polymeria calycina

Scientific classification
- Kingdom: Plantae
- Clade: Tracheophytes
- Clade: Angiosperms
- Clade: Eudicots
- Clade: Asterids
- Order: Solanales
- Family: Convolvulaceae
- Tribe: Convolvuleae
- Genus: Polymeria; R.Br.

= Polymeria =

Genus of flowering plants

Polymeria is a genus of plants in the tribe Convolvuleae in the family Convolvulaceae. Plants of this genus typically bear at least somewhat elongated leaves with bases of an at least subtly sagittate shape. Other generic typicalities include a pink-mauve corolla with a white-and-yellow center, and a stigma divided into multiple – sometimes more than ten – parts.

== Species ==
- Polymeria ambigua R.Br.
- Polymeria angusta F.Muell.
- Polymeria calycina R.Br.
- Polymeria distigma Benth.
- Polymeria lanata R.Br.
- Polymeria longifolia Lindl.
- Polymeria marginata Benth.
- Polymeria mollis (Benth.) Domin
- Polymeria pusilla R.Br.
- Polymeria quadrivalvis R.Br.
- Polymeria subhirsuta Domin
