= List of beaches in Sydney =

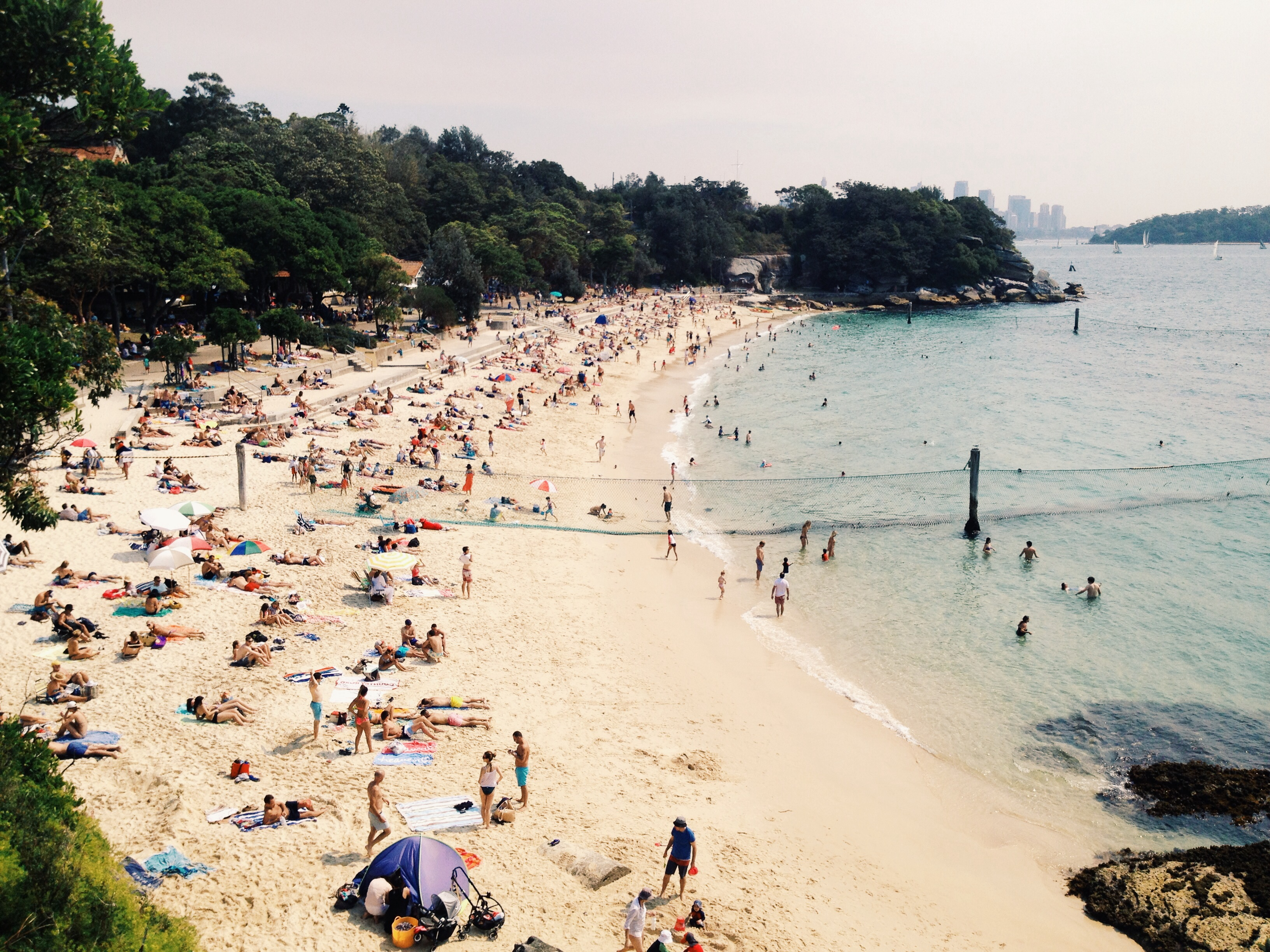
Nielsen Park Beach in summer.

The city of Sydney, Australia, is home to some of the finest and most famous beaches in the world. There are well over 100 beaches in the city, stretching from Palm Beach in the north to Garie Beach in the south, ranging in size from a few metres to several kilometres, located along the city's Pacific Ocean coastline and its harbours, bays and rivers.

With around 30 surf beaches and dozens of harbour coves, Sydney is almost unrivalled in the world for the number and quality of beaches available. The water and sand among the city beaches, despite their popularity, are remarkably clean. The beach watch program was established in 1989 in response to community concern about the impact of sewage pollution on human health and the environment at Sydney's ocean beaches.

== Ocean beaches ==
Sydney's ocean beaches include the internationally renowned Bondi, Coogee, Cronulla and Manly. The ocean beaches are usually divided into the Northern Beaches, located north of the entrance to Sydney Harbour and the southern beaches which are in the Eastern Suburbs and Sutherland Shire area. Most beach suburbs have one beach but some have more. Manly has eight beaches that range from the large 1.6 km Ocean Beach to the tiny Fairy Bower Beach.

From north to south, Sydney's ocean beaches are:

Northern

- Avalon
- Bilgola
- Bungan
- Collaroy
- Curl Curl
- Dee Why
- Fairy Bower
- Fishermans
- Freshwater
- Long Reef
- Manly
- Mona Vale
- Narrabeen
- Newport
- North Curl Curl
- North Narrabeen
- North Steyne
- Palm Beach
- Queenscliff
- Shelly Beach (Manly)
- Turimetta
- Warriewood
- Whale Beach

Southern

- Bondi
- Bronte
- Clovelly
- Coogee
- Cronulla
- Elouera
- Gordons Bay
- Little Bay
- Malabar
- Maroubra
- North Cronulla
- Phillip Bay
- Shelly Beach (Cronulla)
- Tamarama
- Wanda

When conditions are suitable, a sandy beach forms, in what is normally a rocky inlet, at Mackenzies Bay.

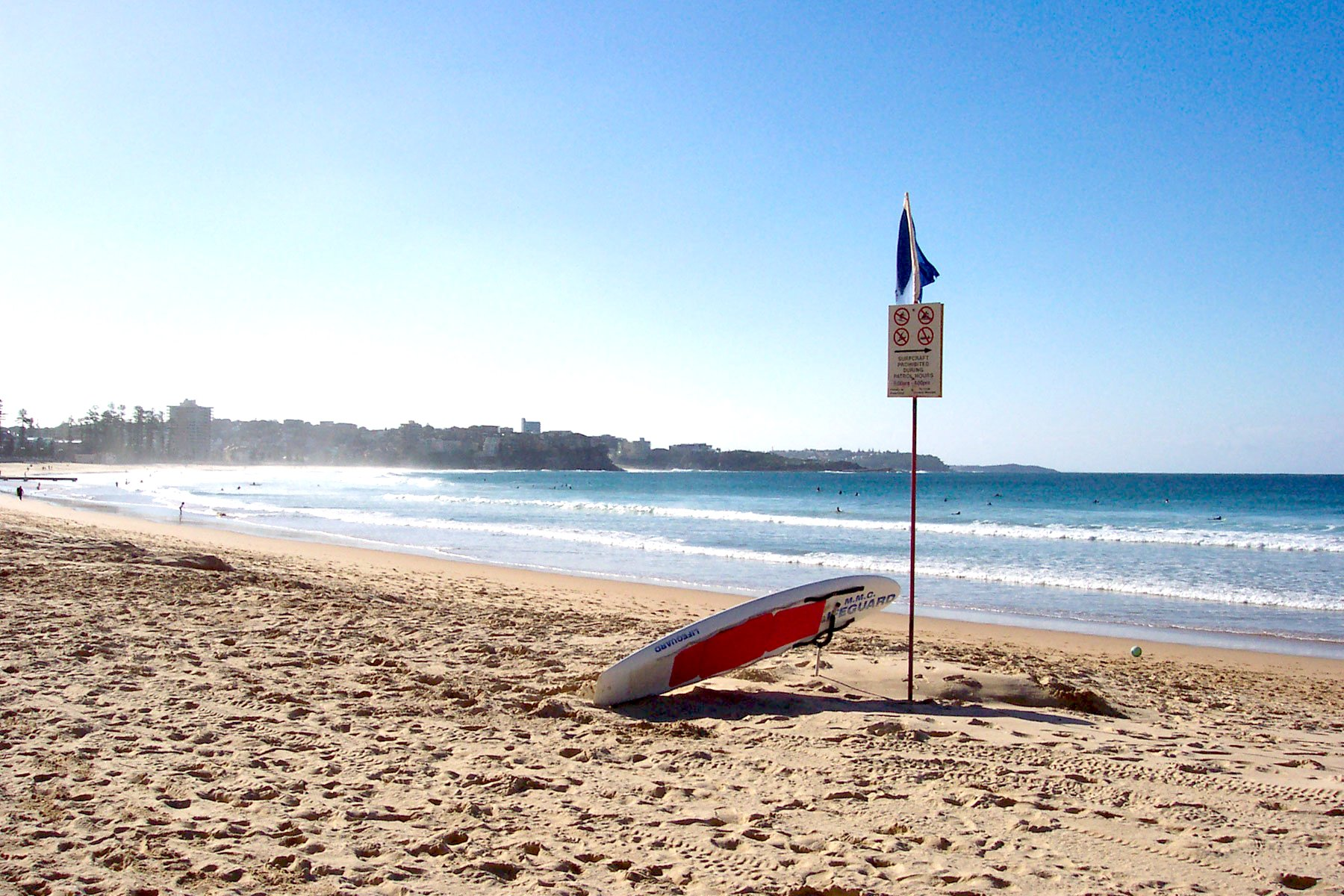
Manly Beach

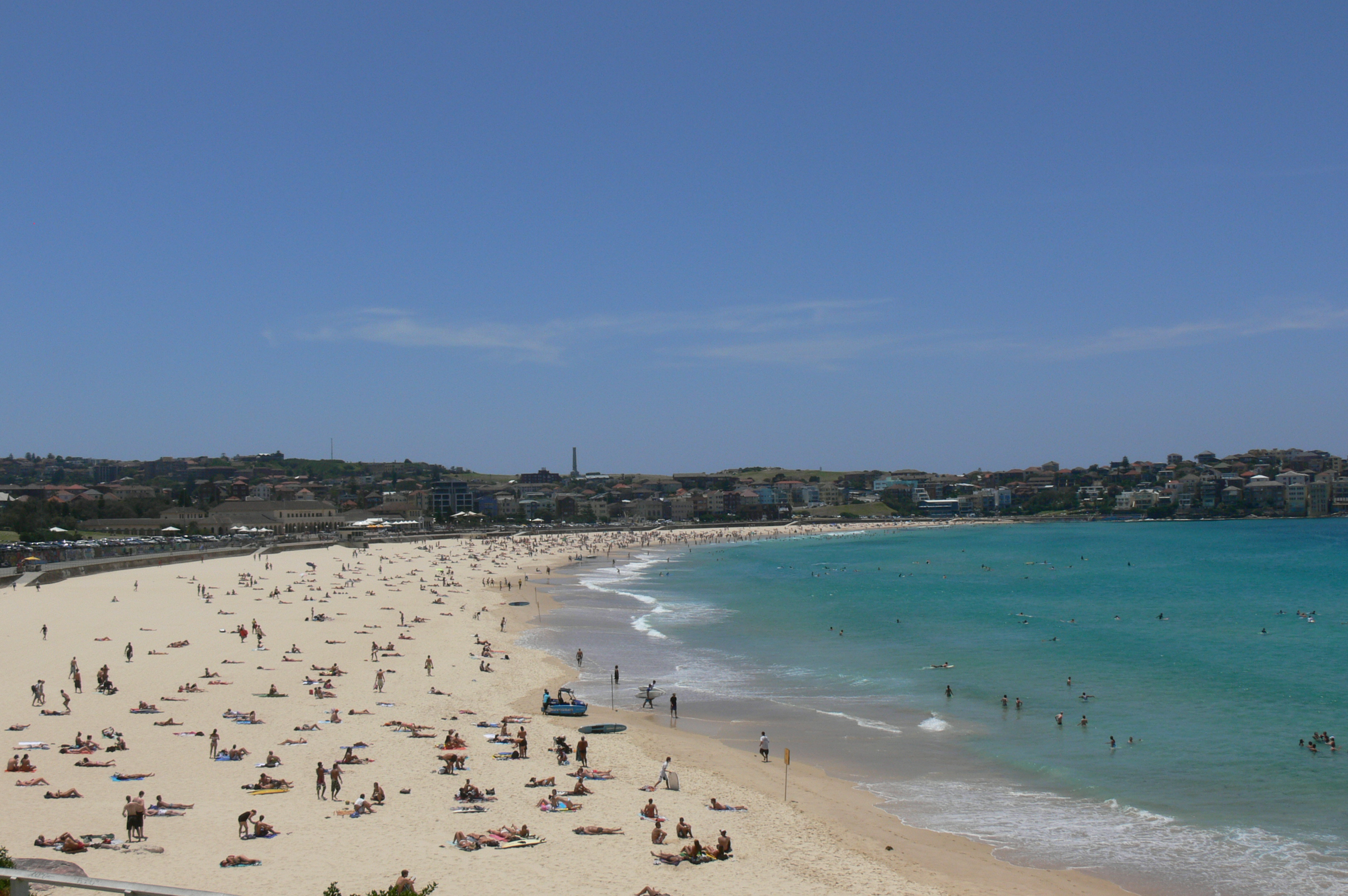
Bondi Beach

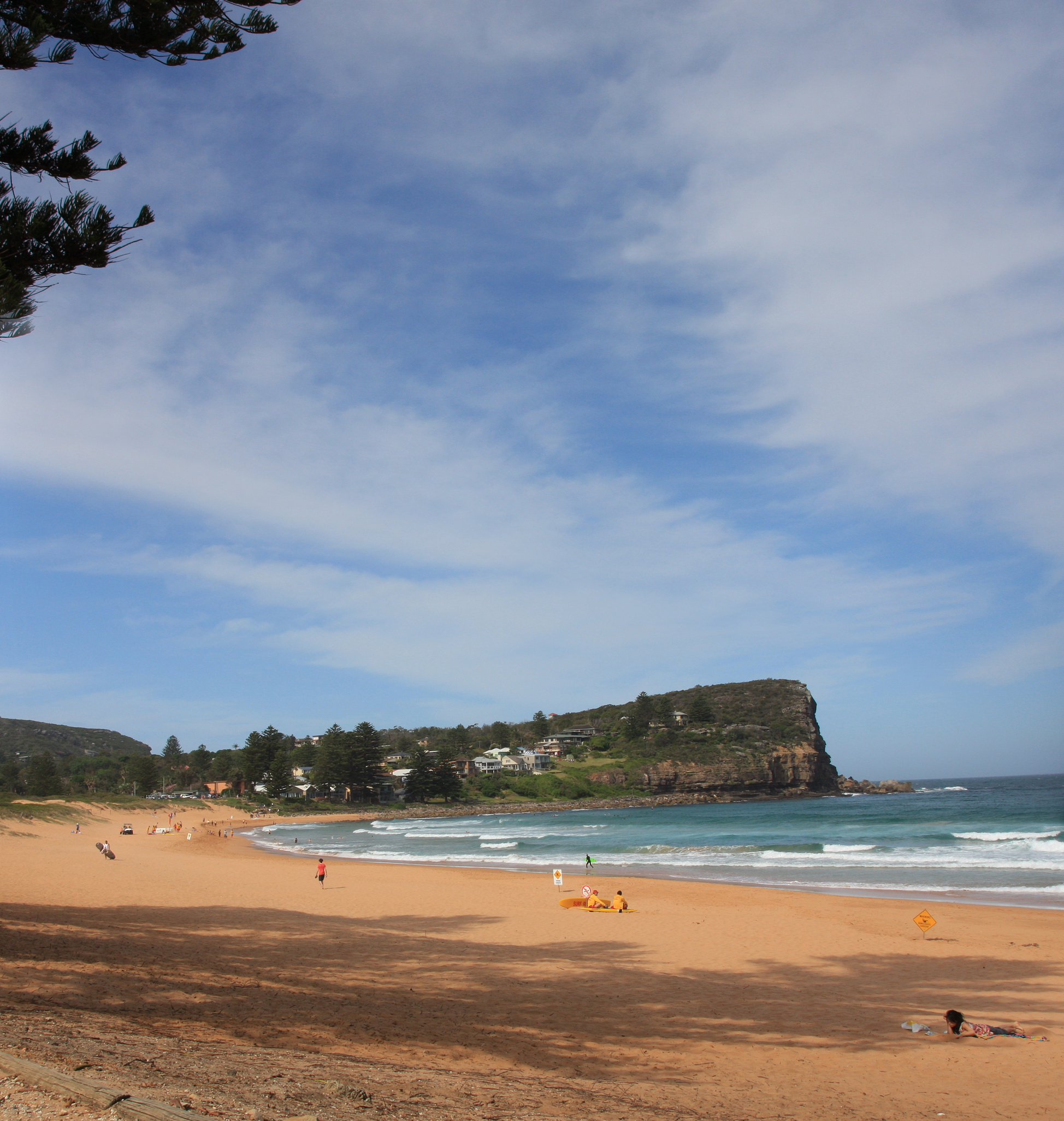
Avalon Beach

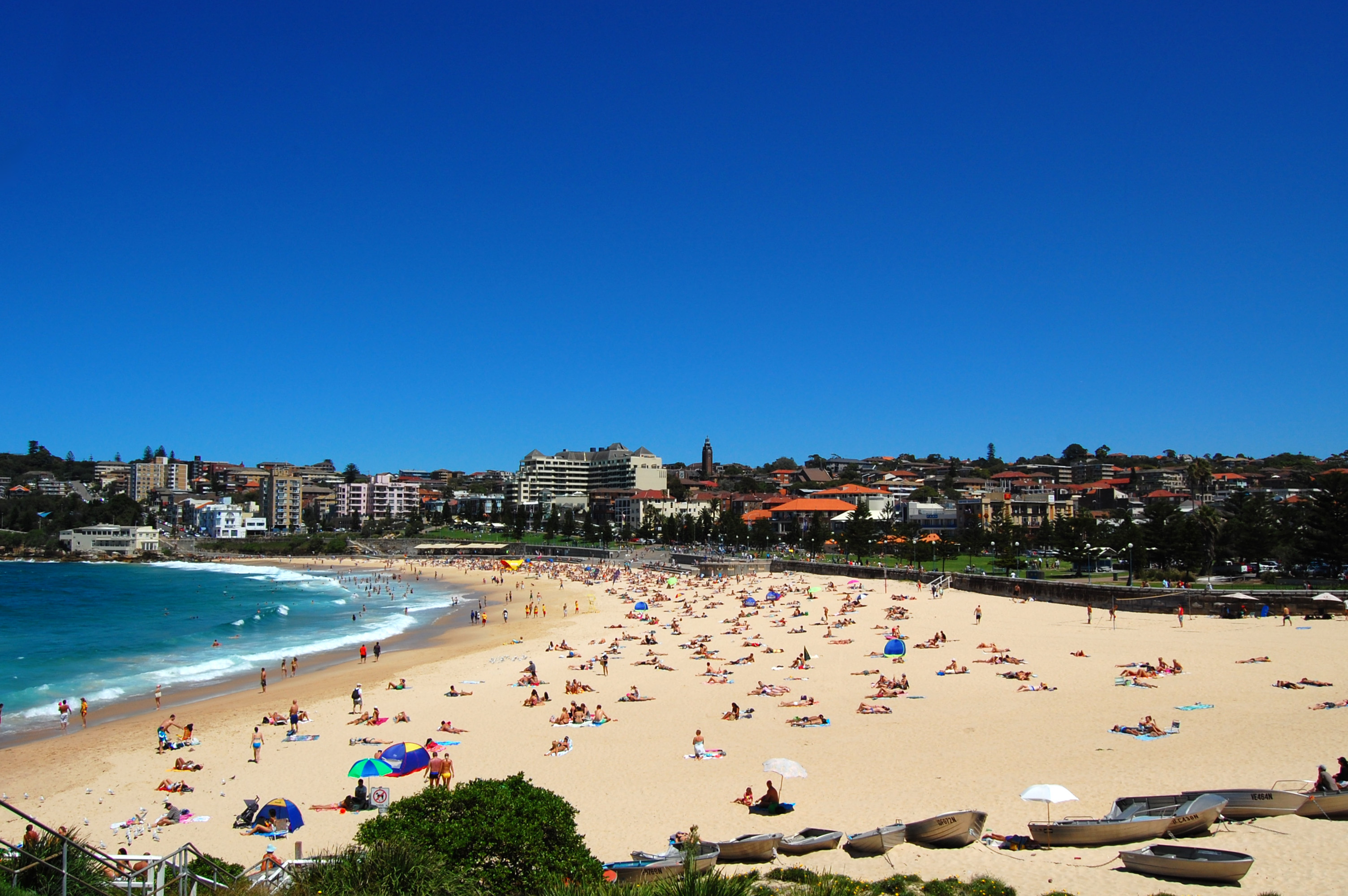
Coogee Beach

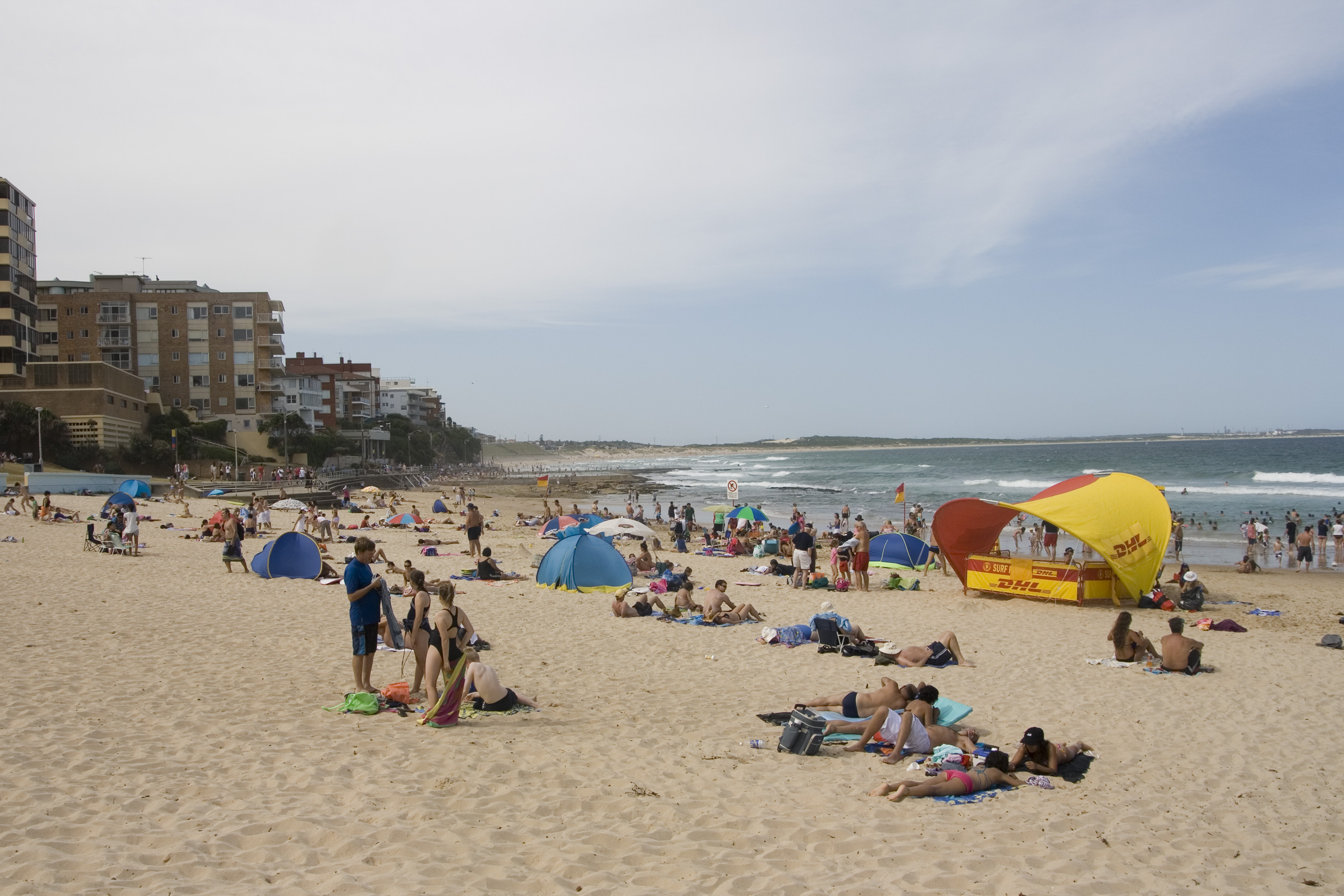
Cronulla Beach

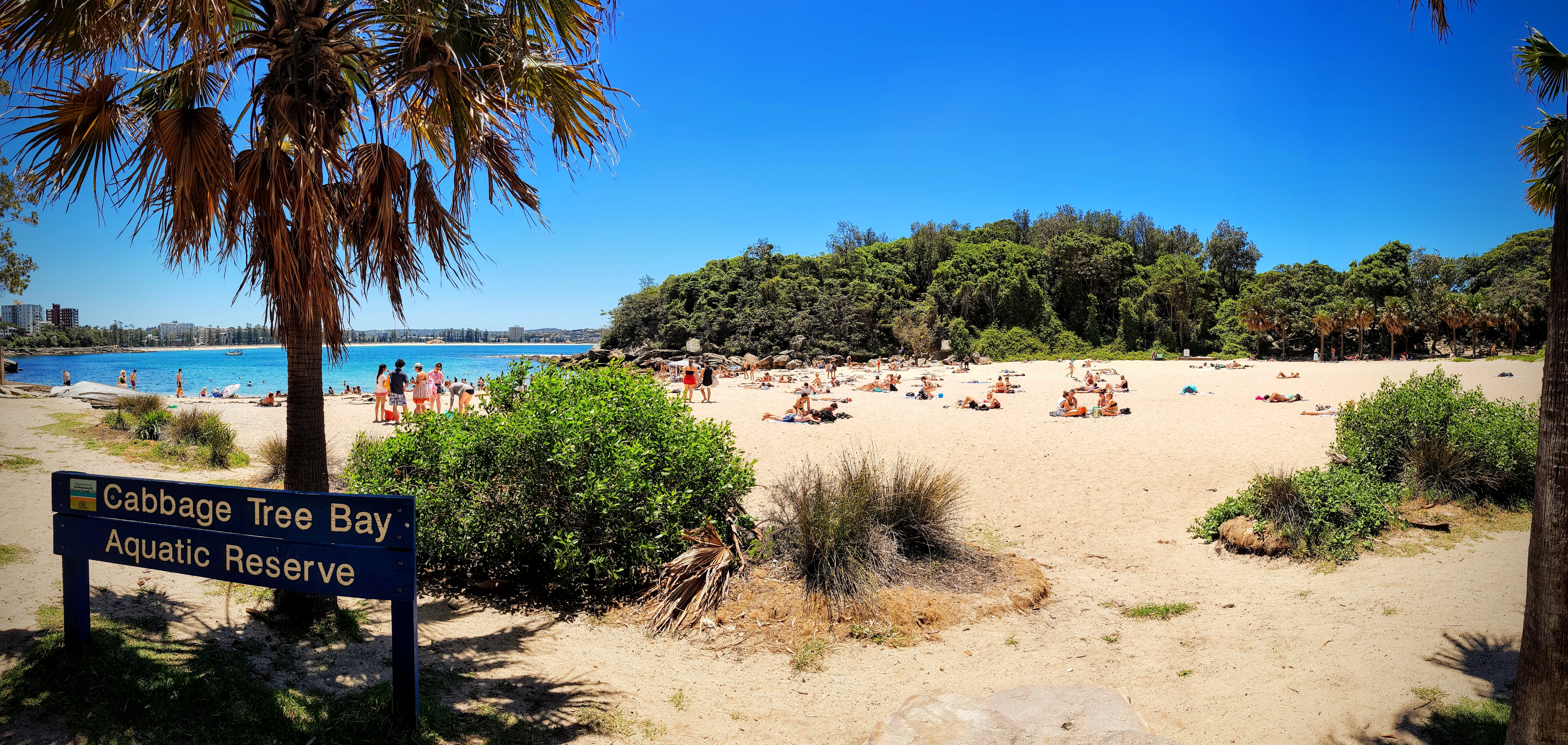
Shelly Beach

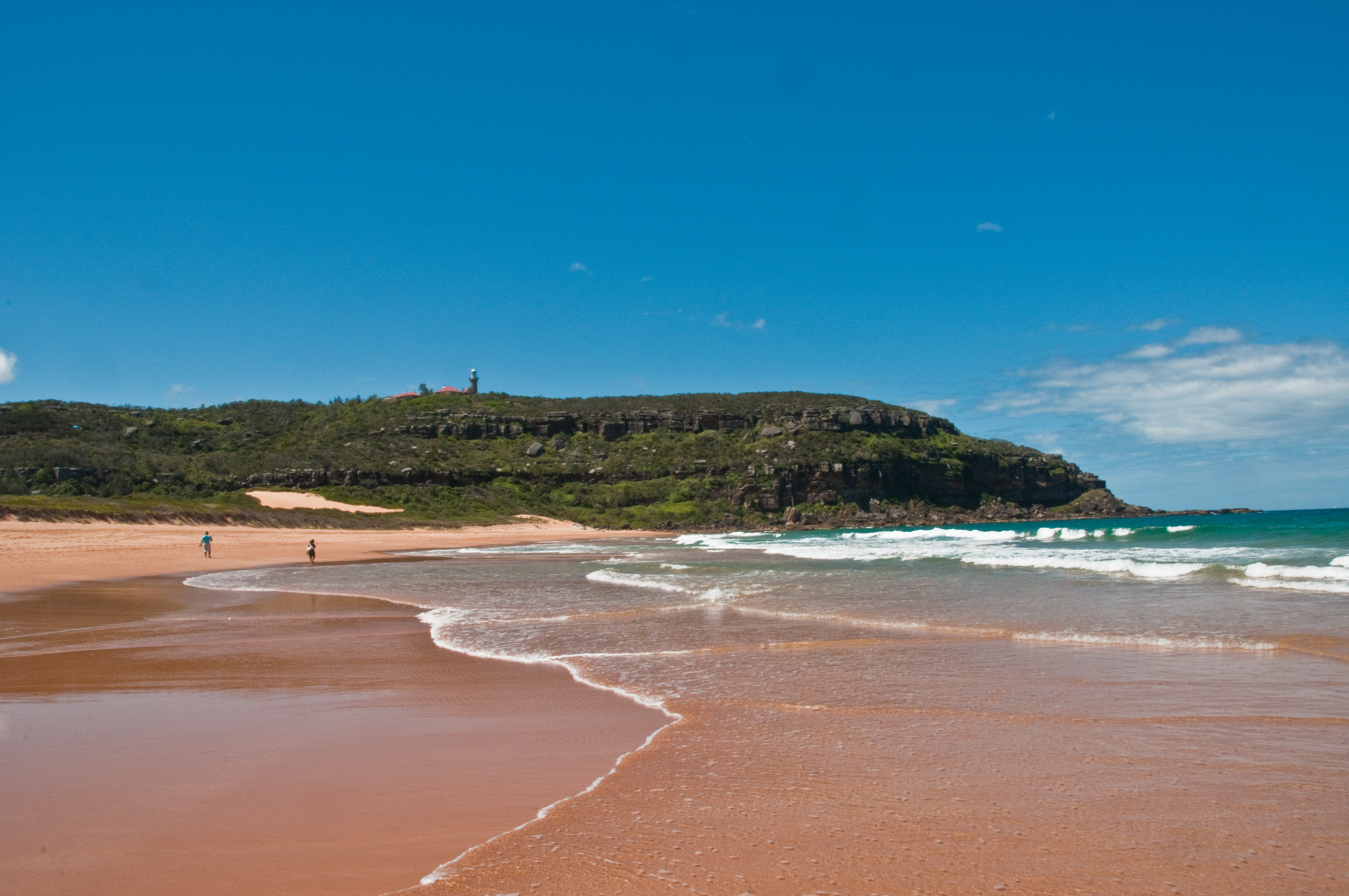
Palm Beach

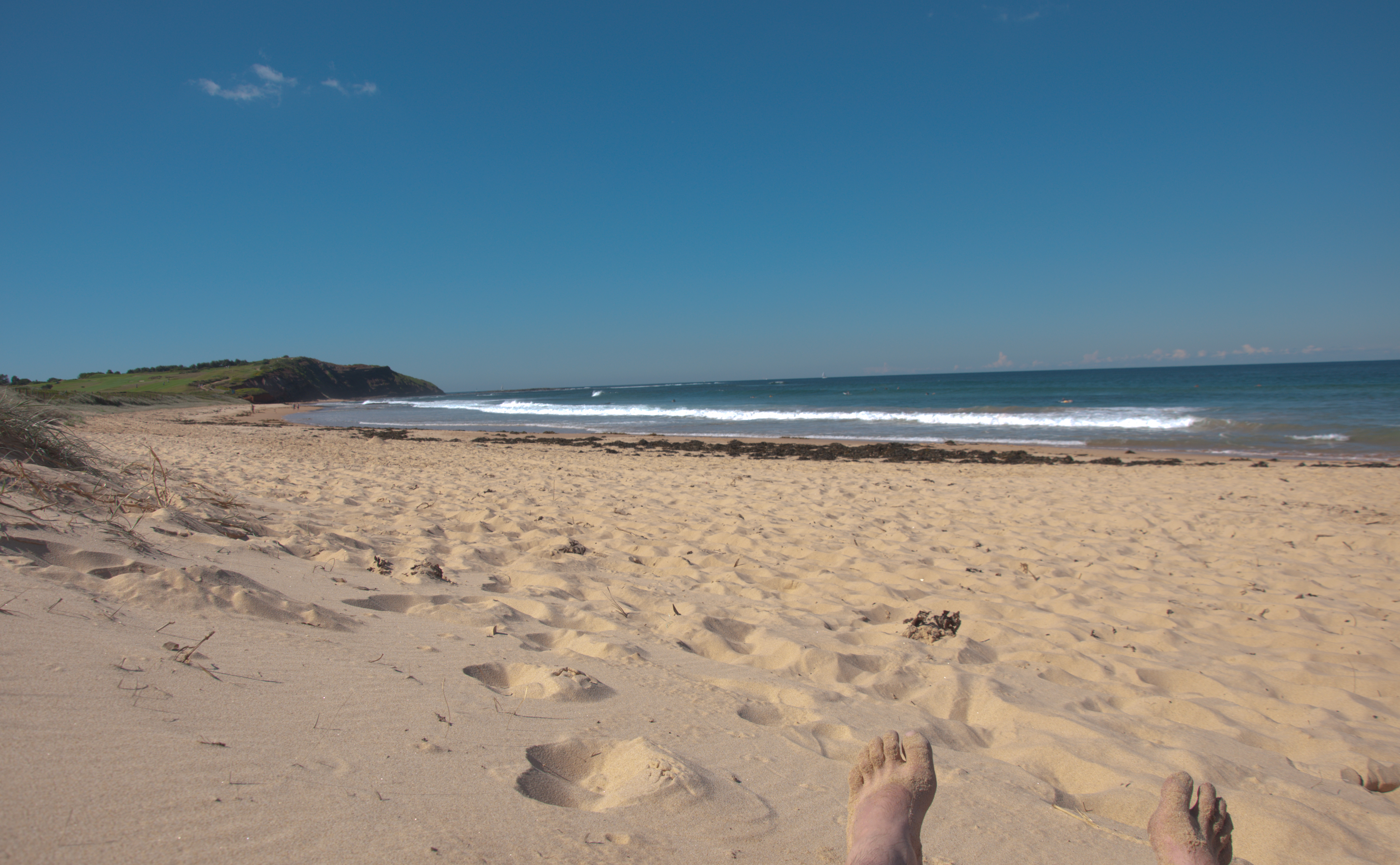
Dee Why Beach

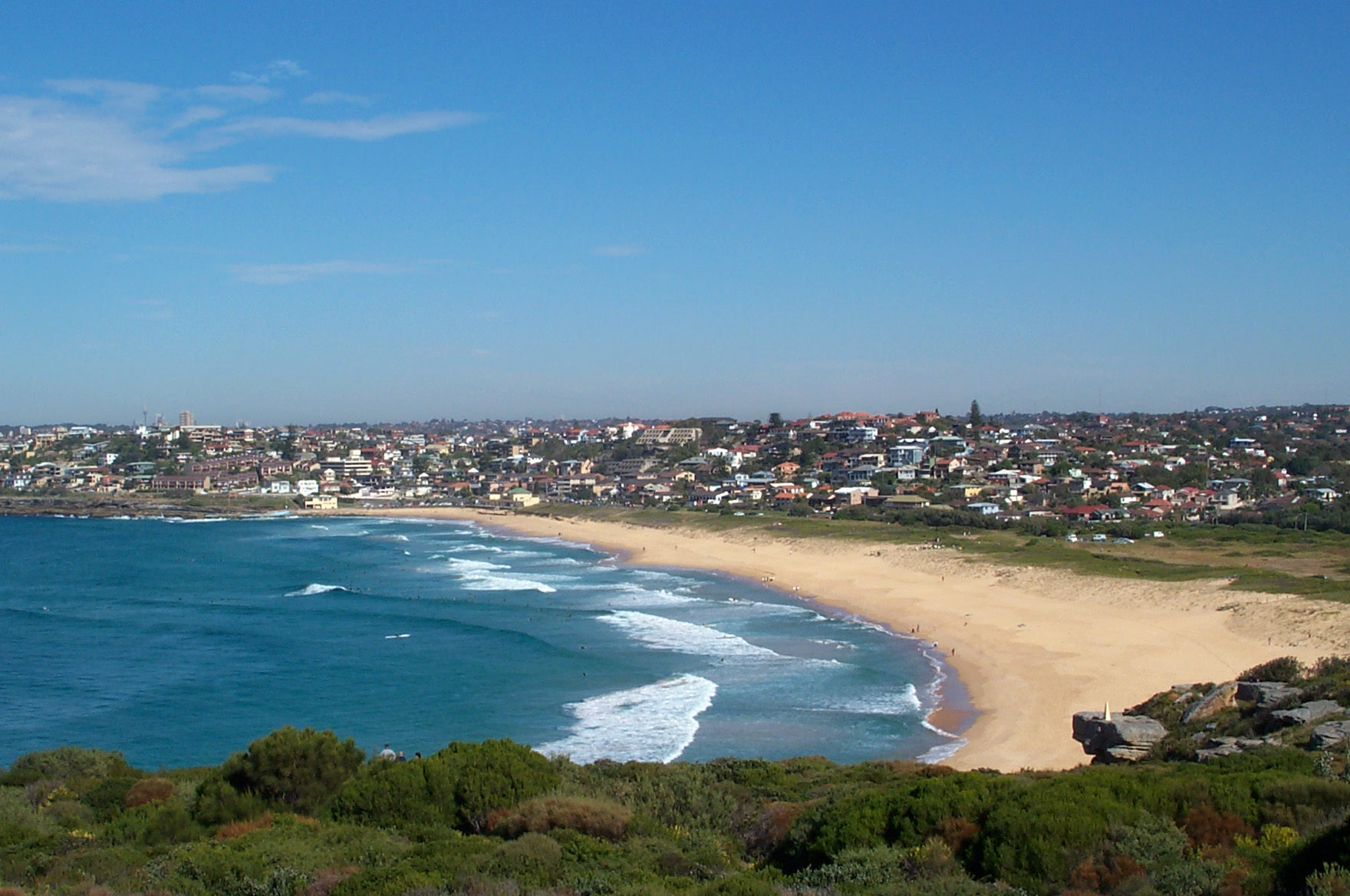
Curl Curl Beach

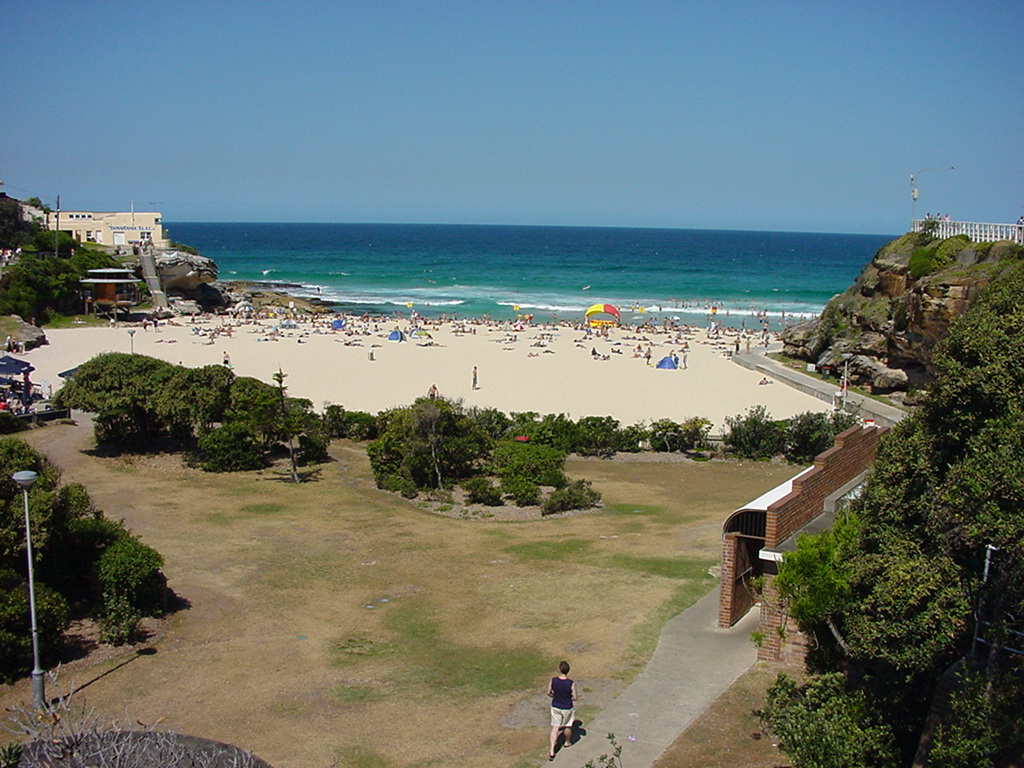
Tamarama Beach

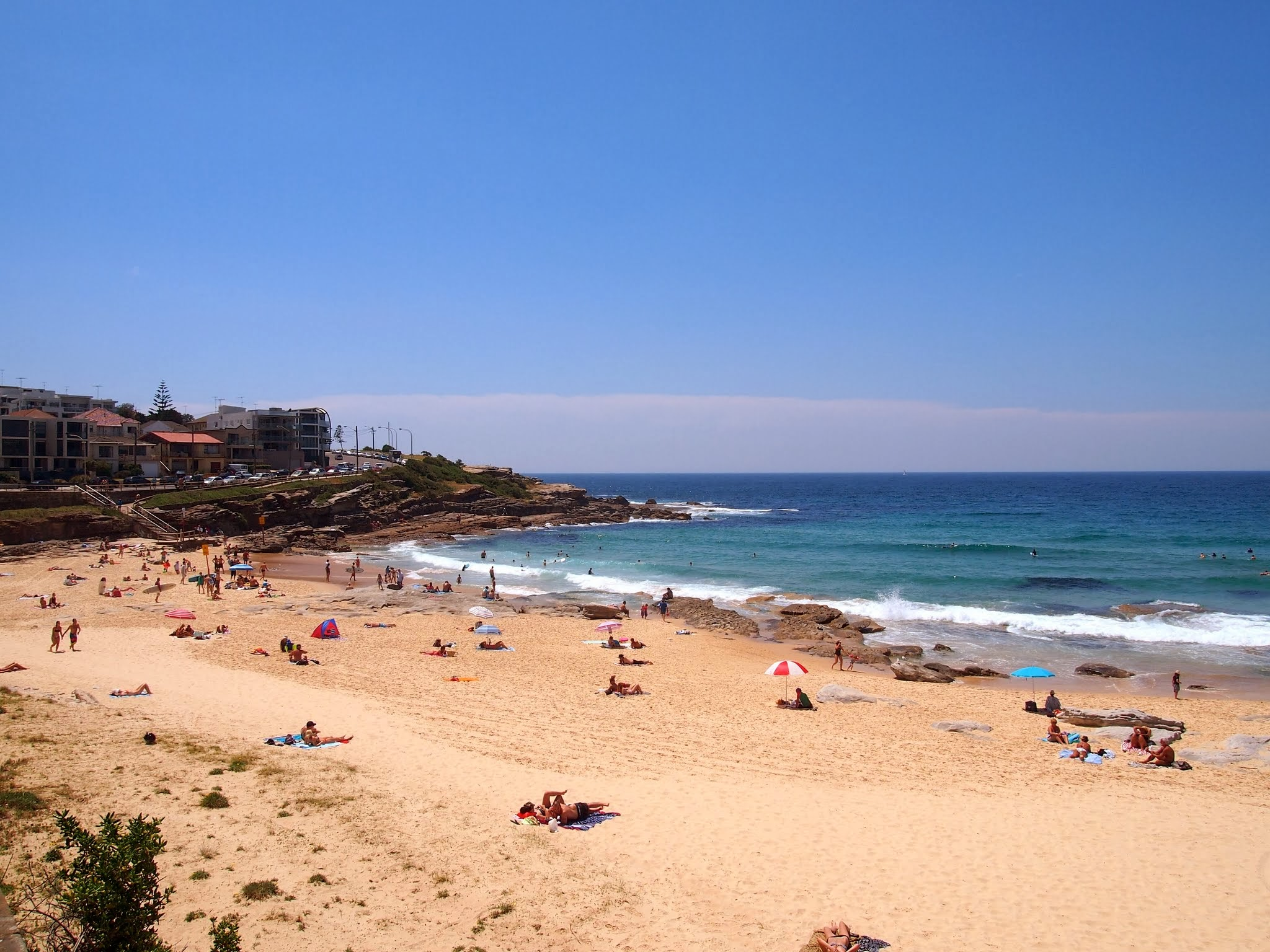
Maroubra Beach

== Sydney Harbour ==
Beaches in Port Jackson include:

- Balmoral Beach
- Clontarf
- Little Manly Beach
- North Head Quarantine Station Beach
- Lady Martins Beach
- Seven Shillings Beach, Point Piper
- Double Bay Beach
- Camp Cove
- Shark Beach
- Milk Beach, Vaucluse
- Chowder Bay, Clifton Gardens
- Chinamans Beach, The Spit
- Washaway Beach
- Obelisk Beach
- Cobblers Beach
- Athol Bay Beach, Clifton Gardens
- Edwards Beach
- Reef Beach
- Castle Rock
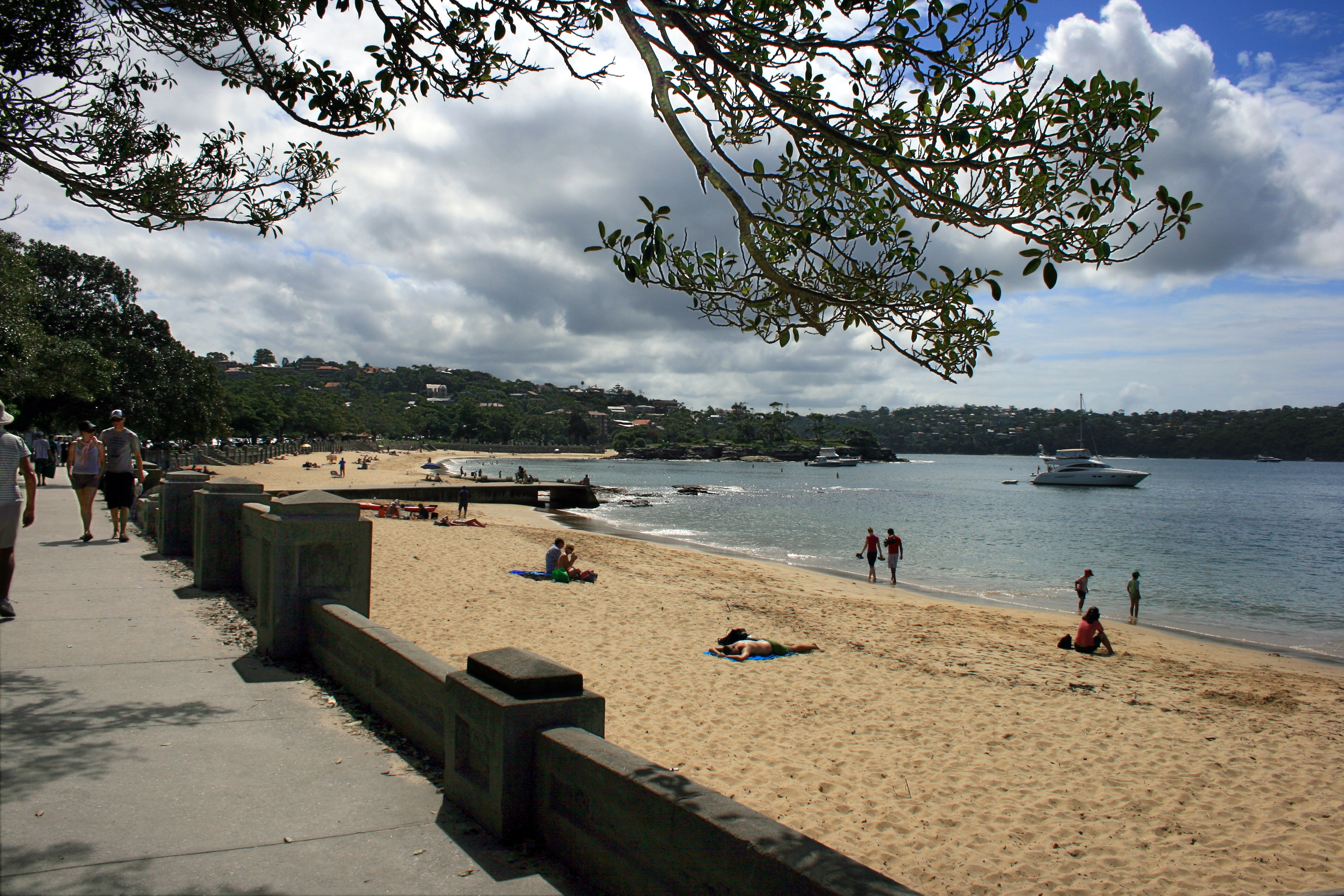
Balmoral Beach

Obelisk Beach

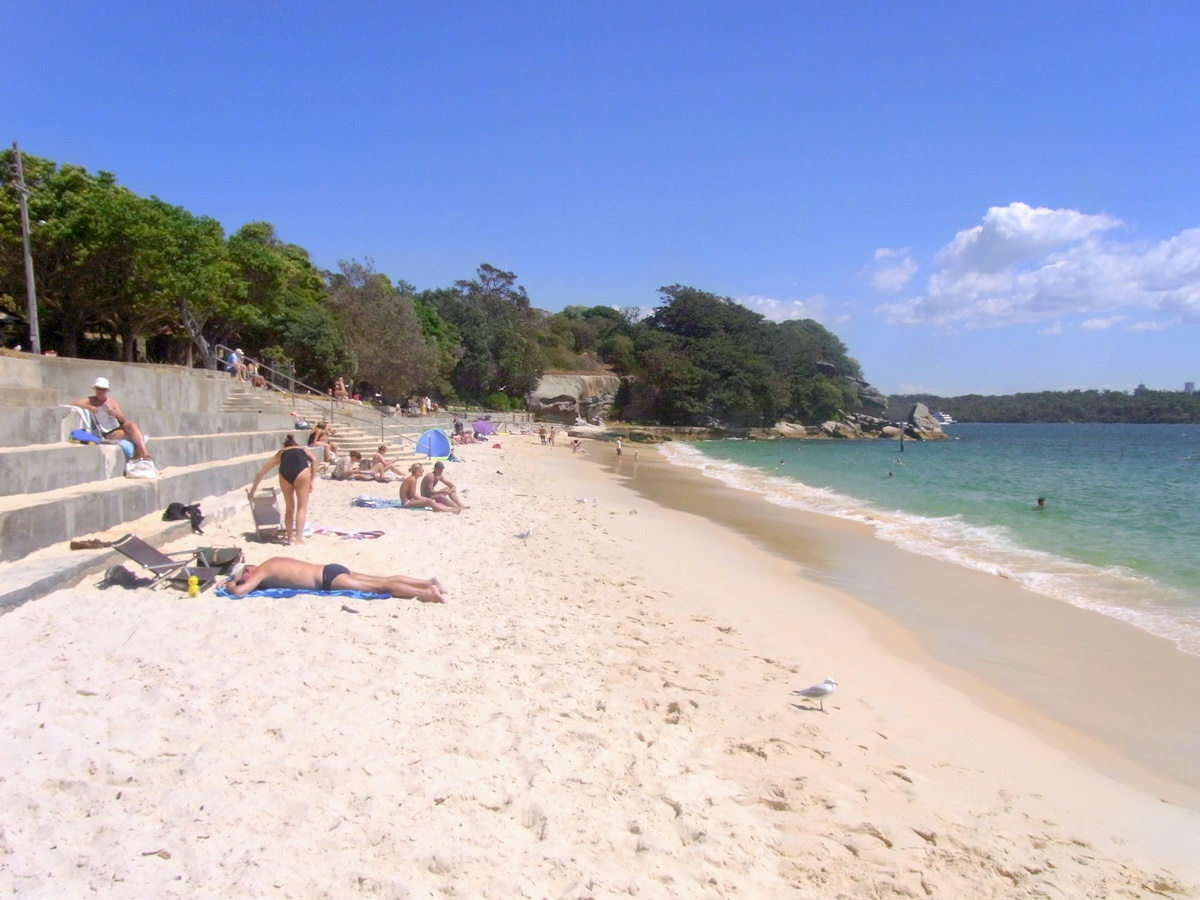
Nielsen Park

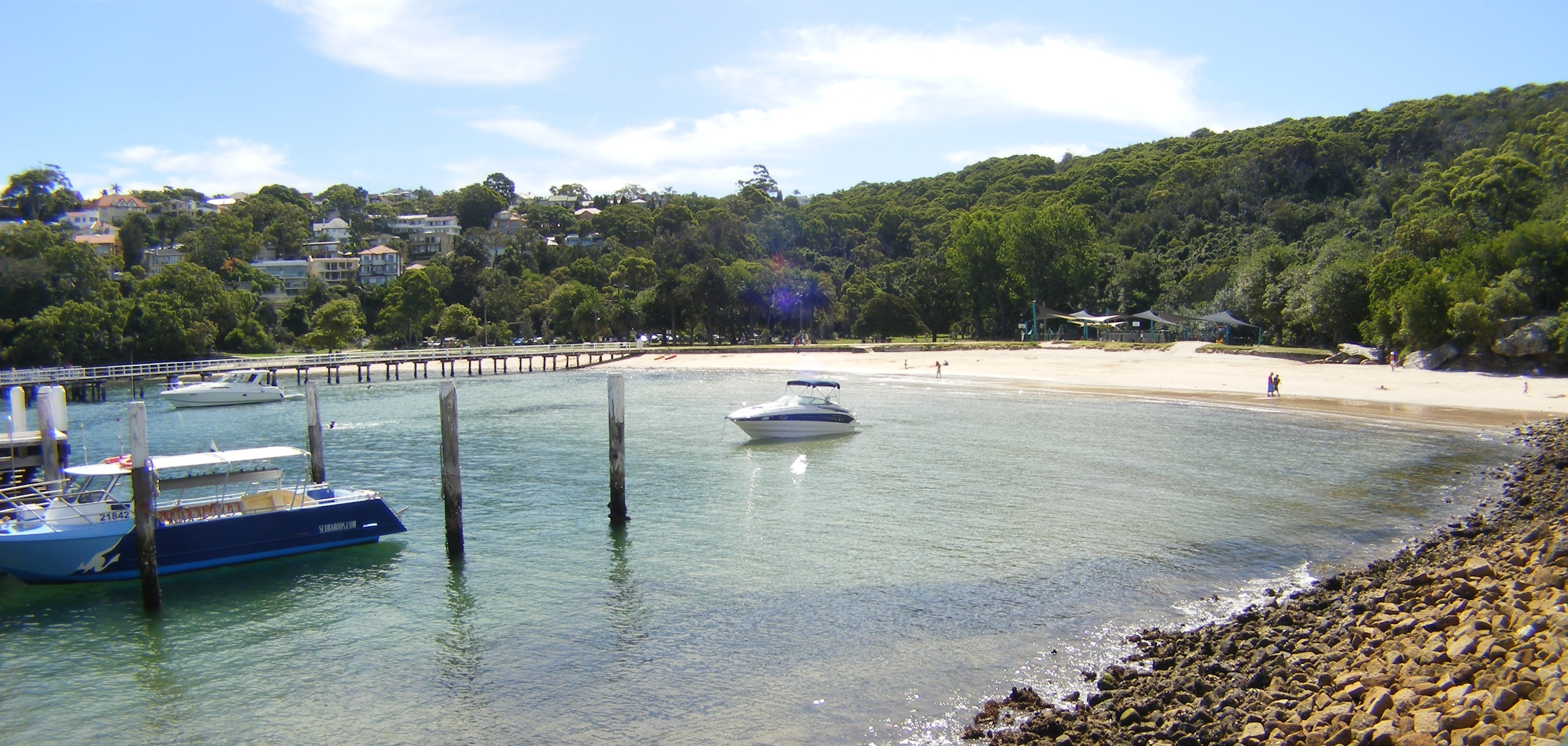
Chowder Bay, Clifton Gardens

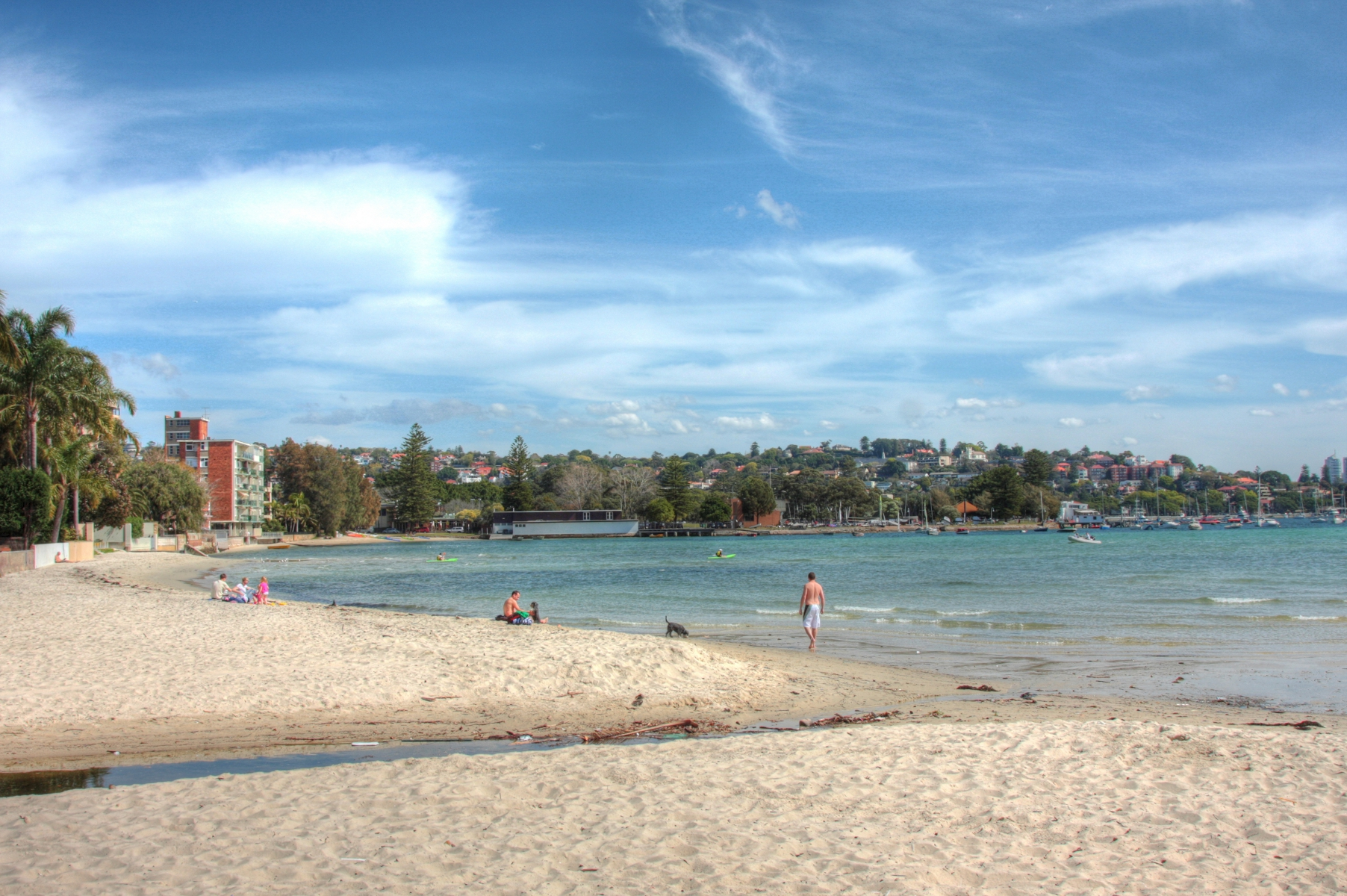
Rose Bay

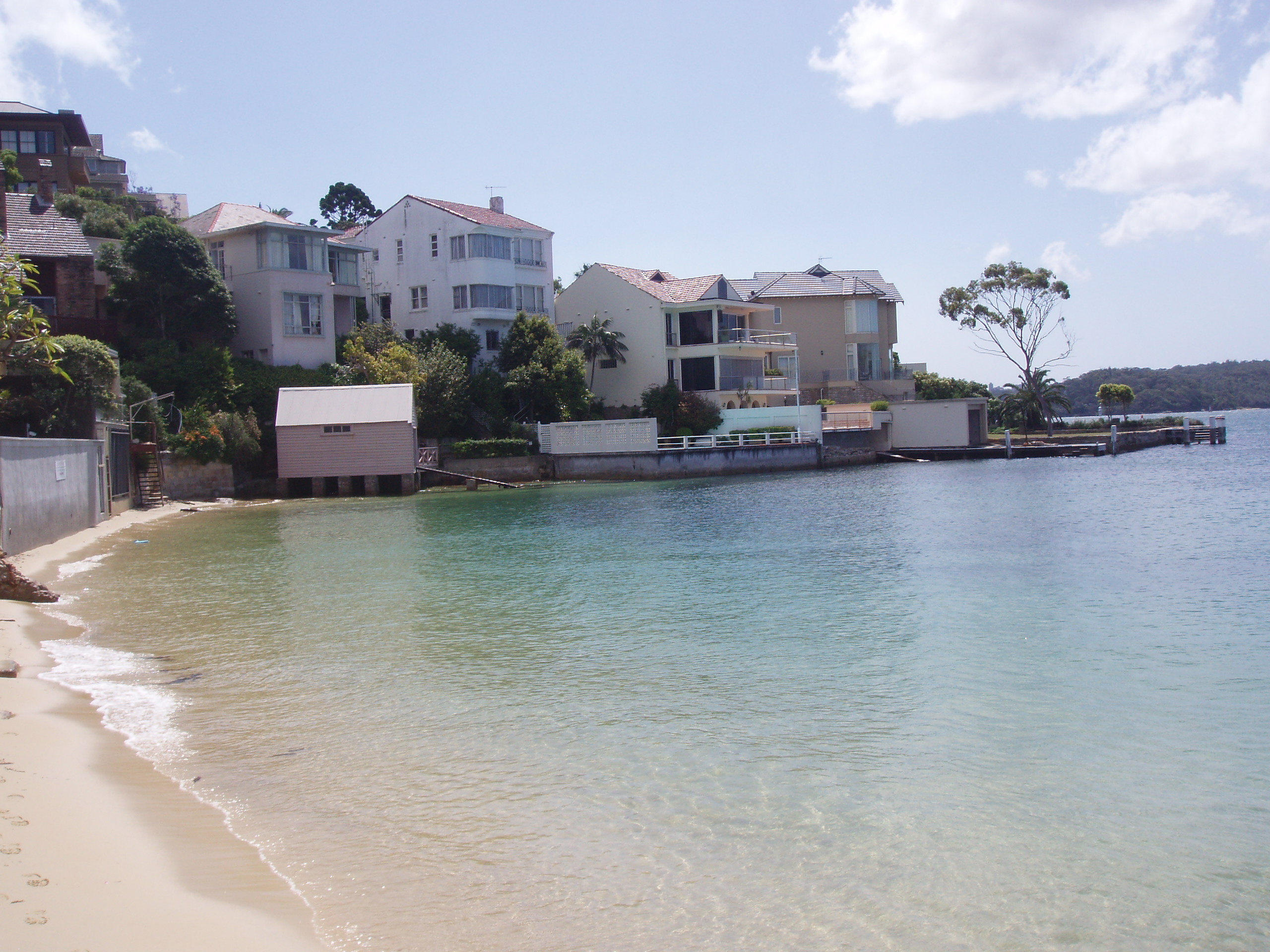
Lady Martins Beach

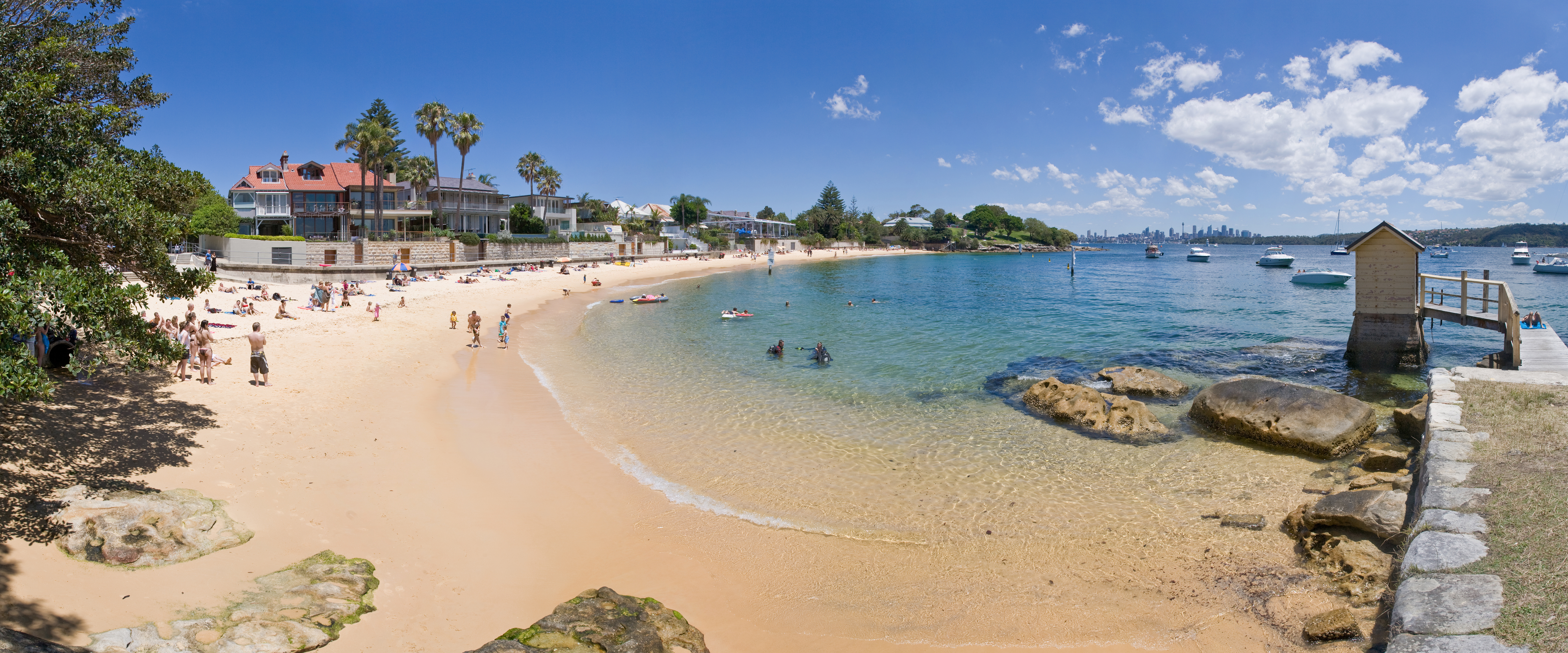
Cape Cove

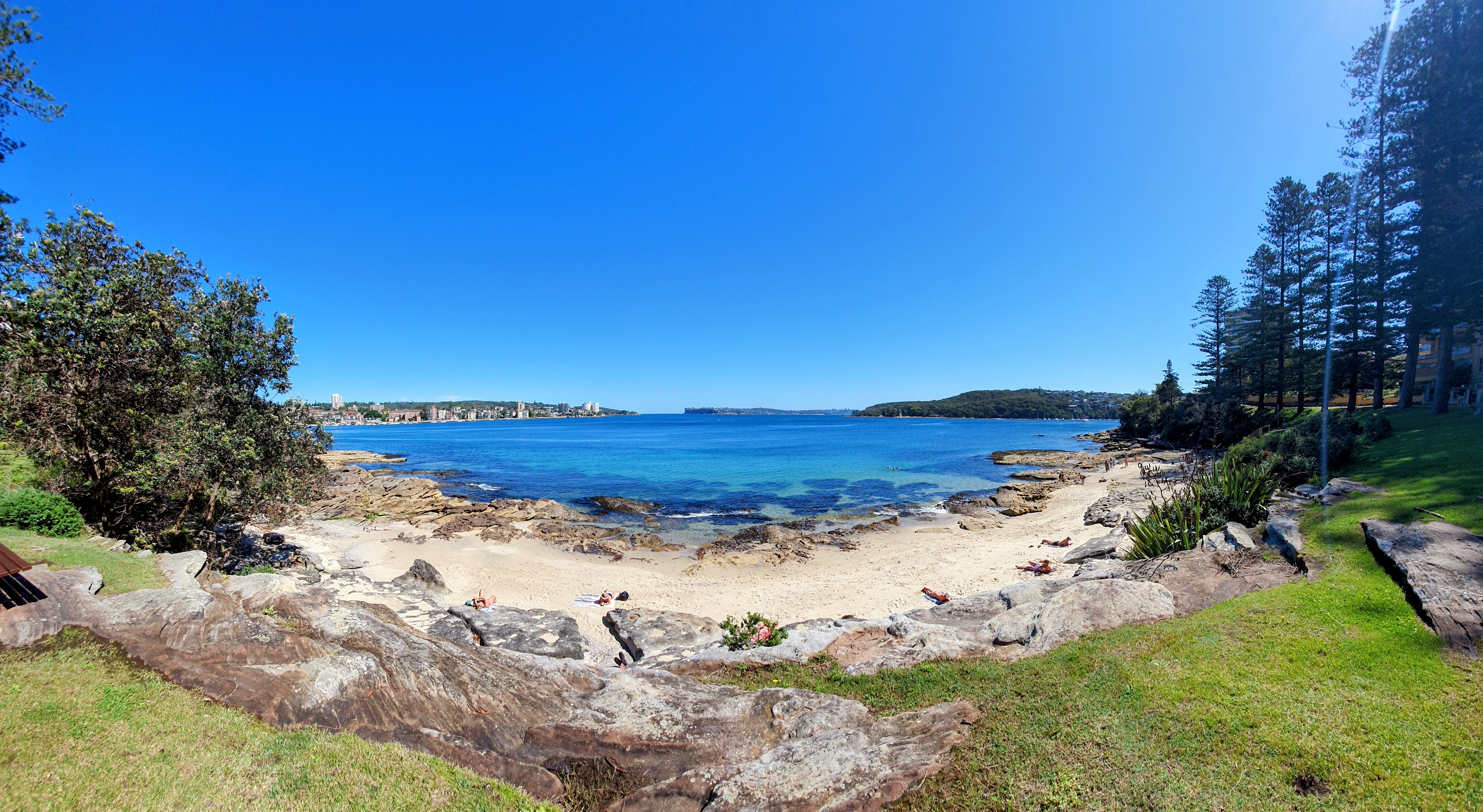
Views across Delwood Beach to Sydney Harbour

== Botany Bay ==
Beaches in Botany Bay include:

- Bumbora Rock at the north end of Yarra Bay
- Congwong Beach
- Cooks River to the west of the airport
- Foreshore Beach
- Frenchmans Bay in La Perouse
- Elephants Trunk
- Lady Robinsons Beach (which includes Brighton Beach, Ramsgate beach and Dolls Point Beach, among others), is known to have the whitest sand in Sydney
- Little Congwong Beach
- Pelican Point
- Penrhyn Beach (possibly now part of the container terminals)
- Silver Beach
- Towra Beach
- Taren Spit Beach
- Yarra Bay

There are also more beaches along the Hawkesbury River to the north, and Botany Bay and Port Hacking to the south.

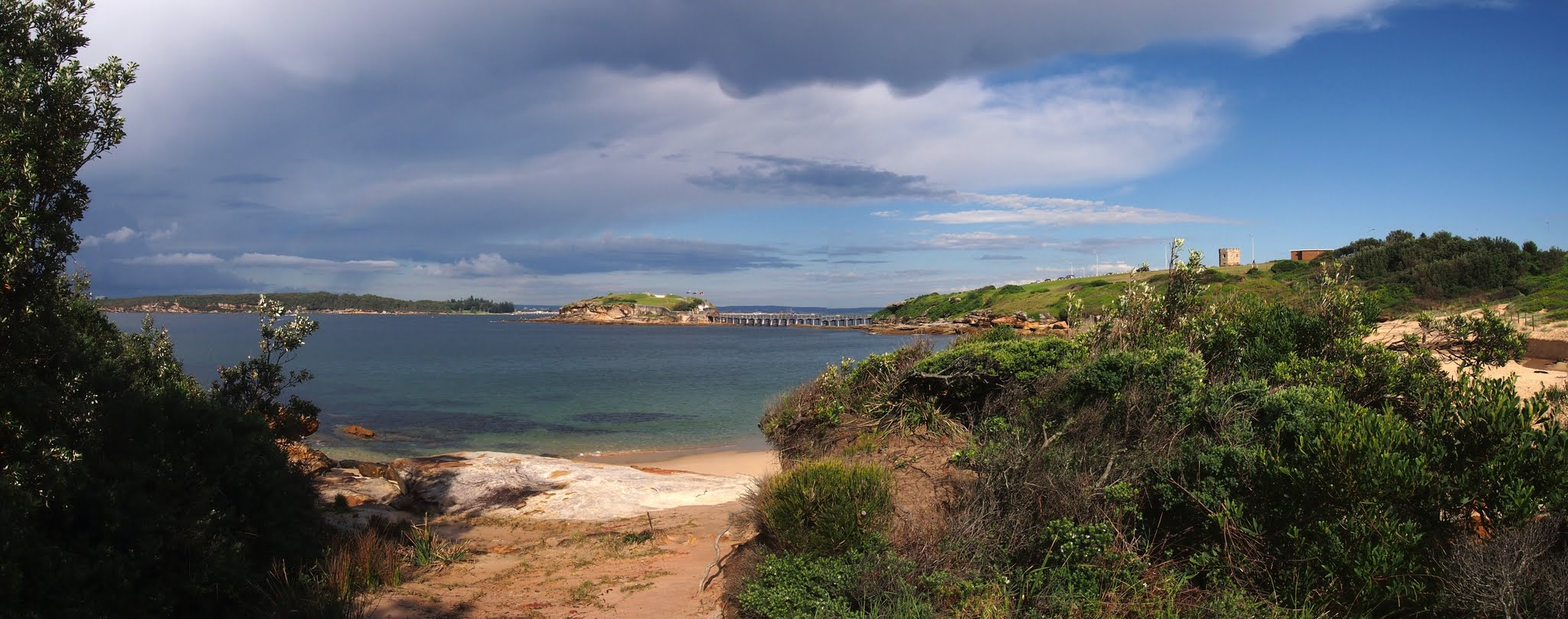
Congwong Beach

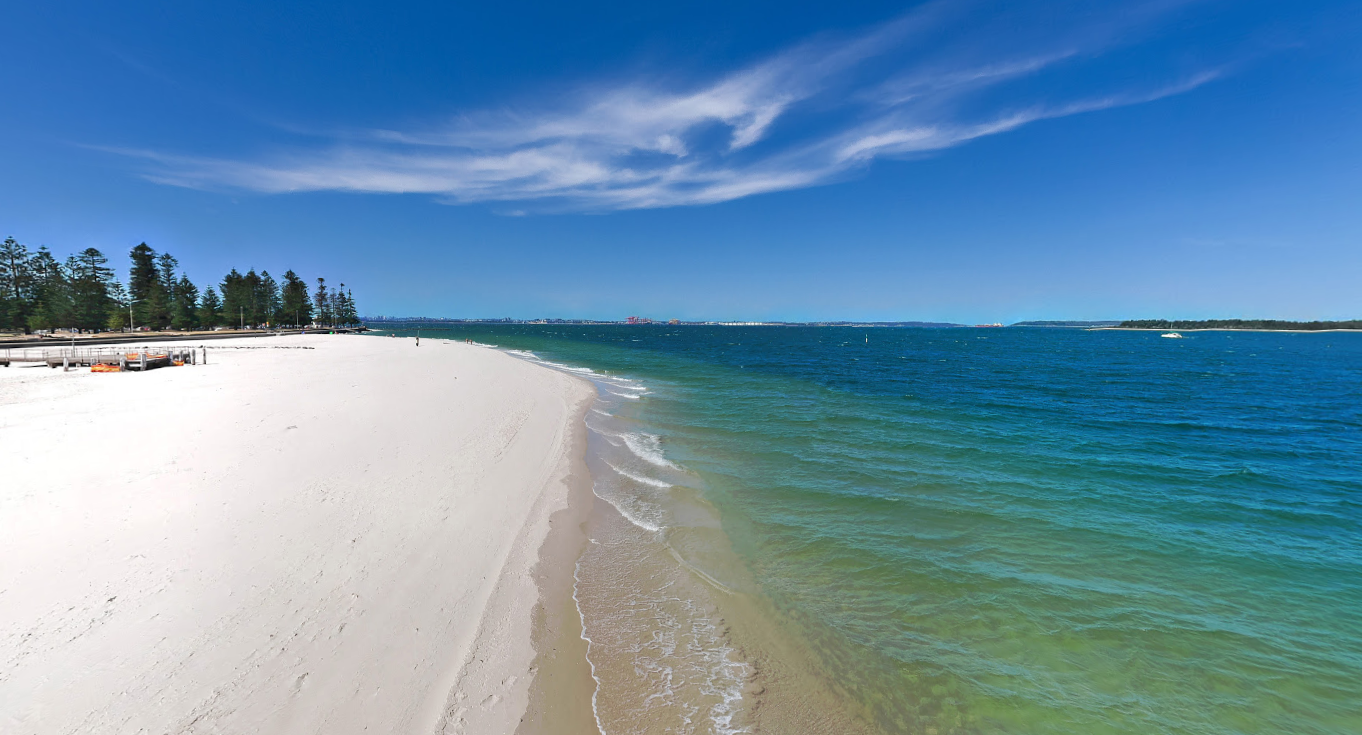
Dolls Point Beach

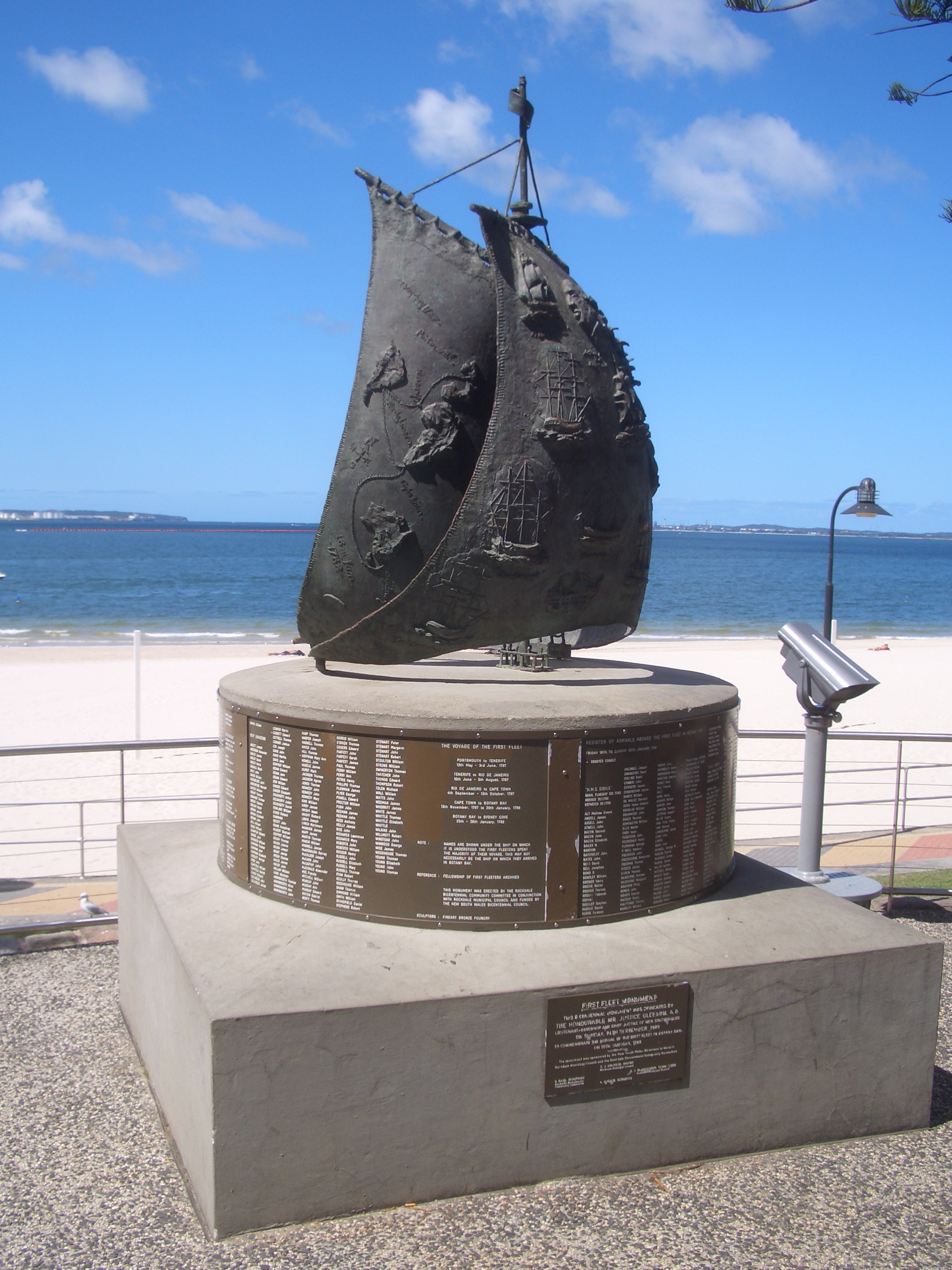
Brighton Beach

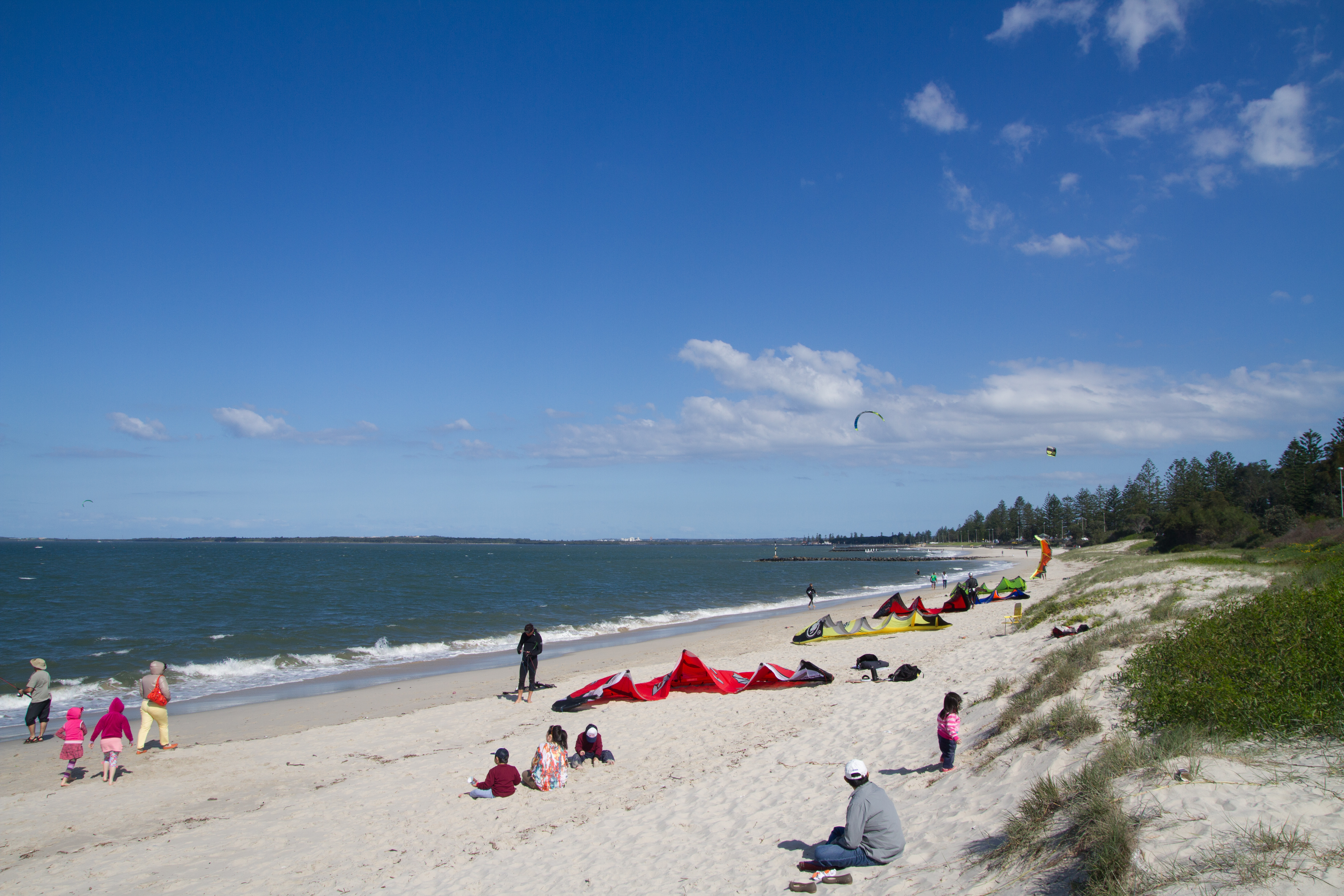
Ramsgate Beach

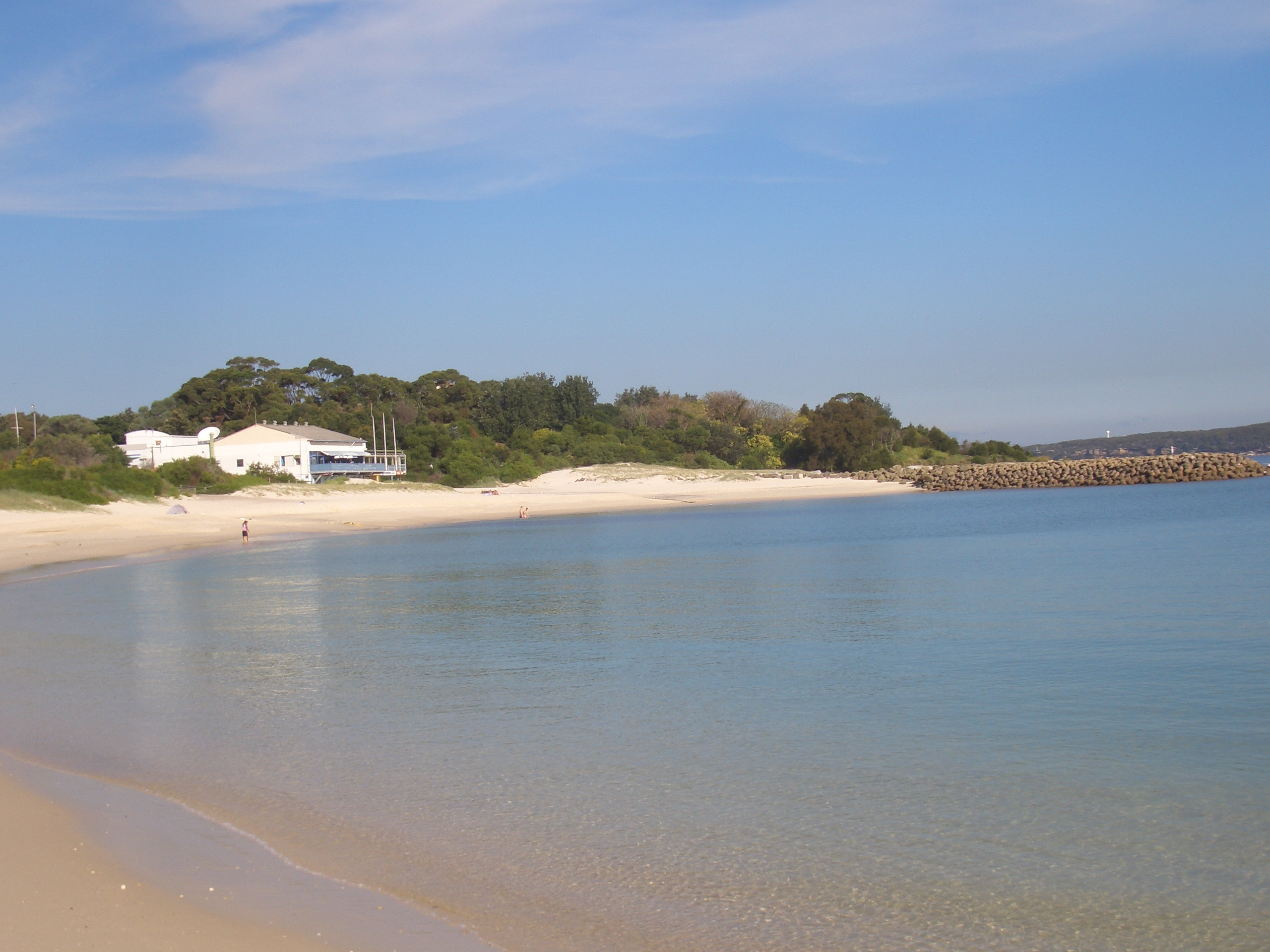
Yarra Bay

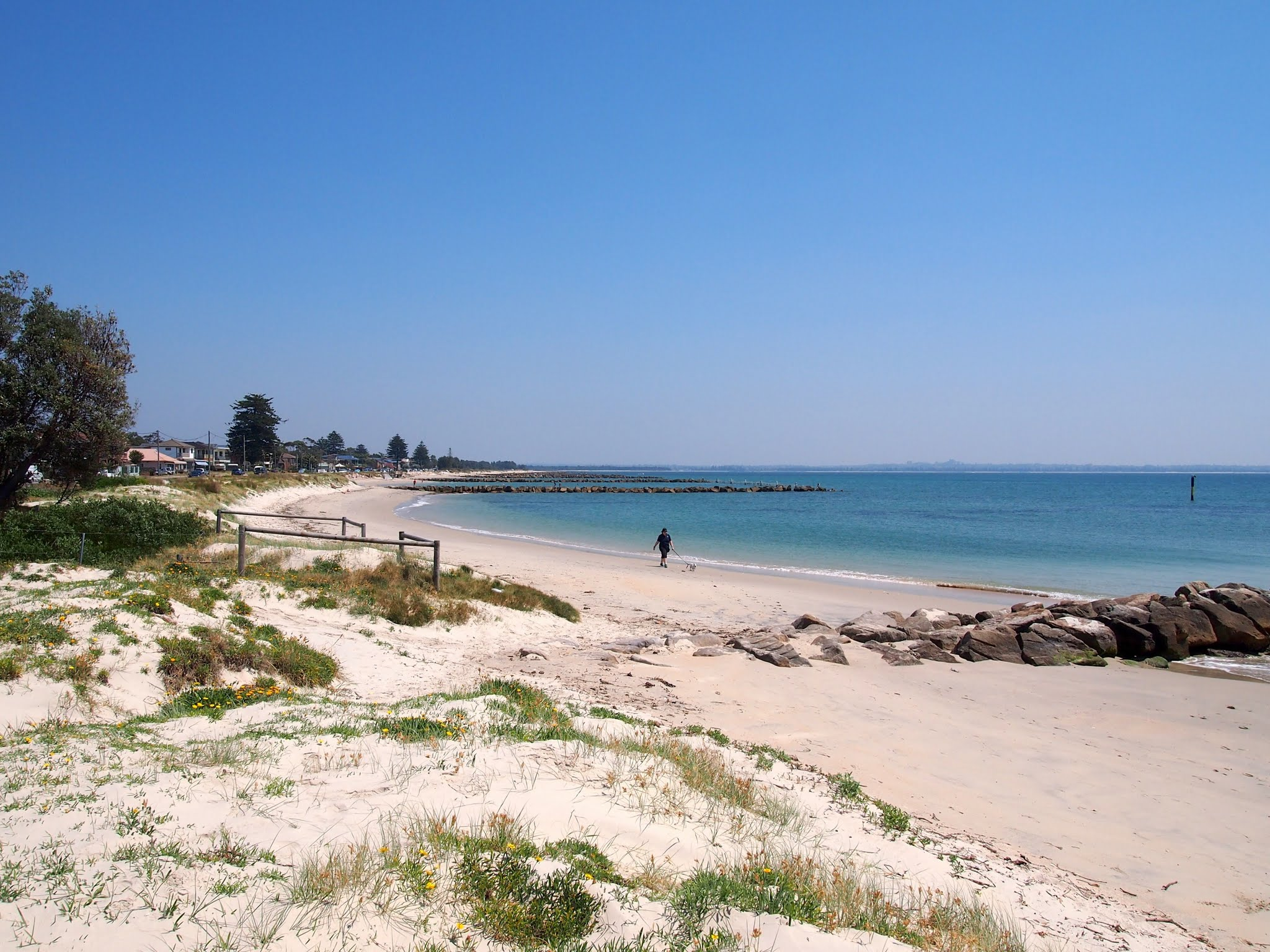
Silver Beach, Cronulla

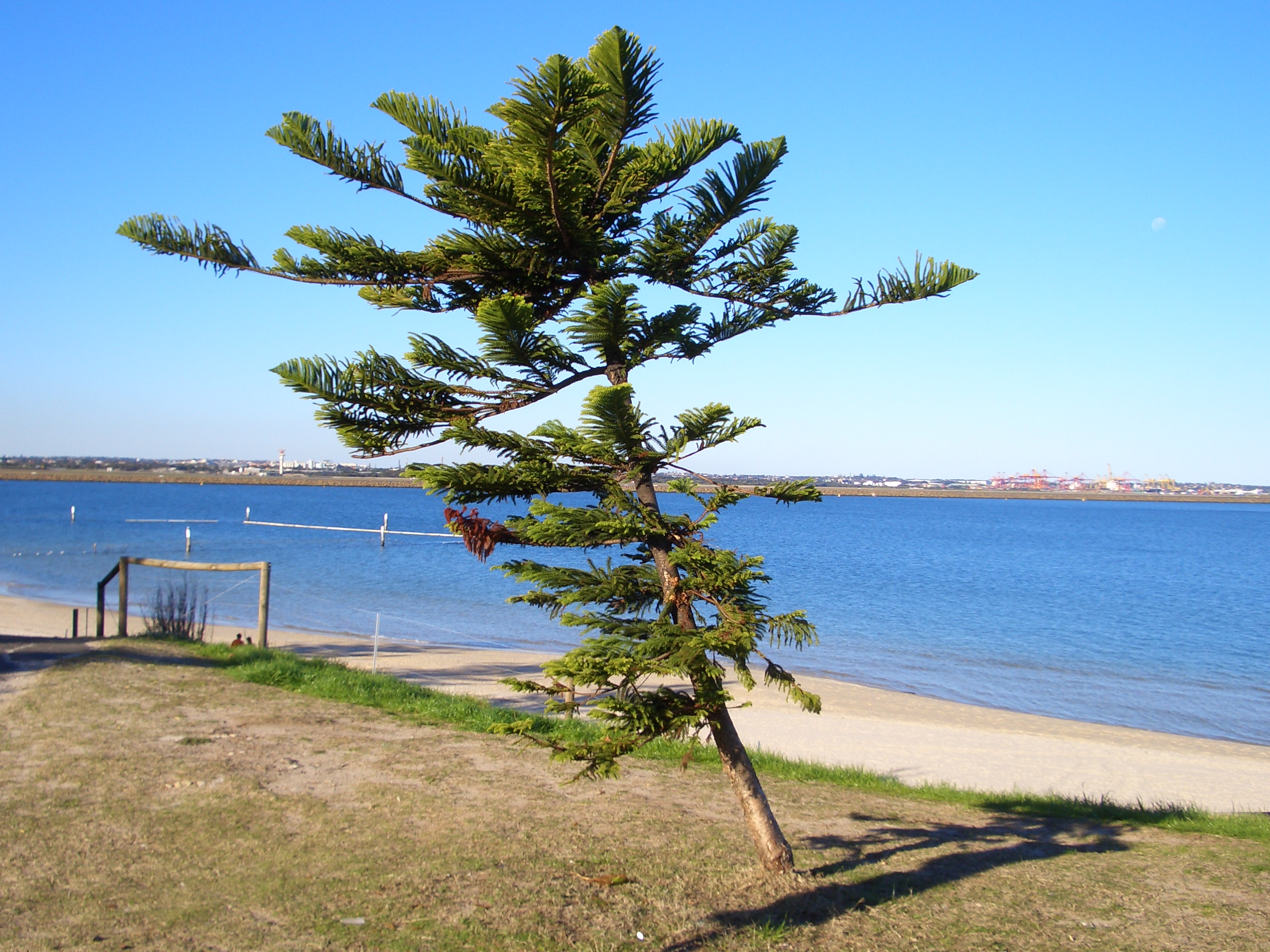
Kyeemagh Beach

== See also ==
- List of beaches in Australia
