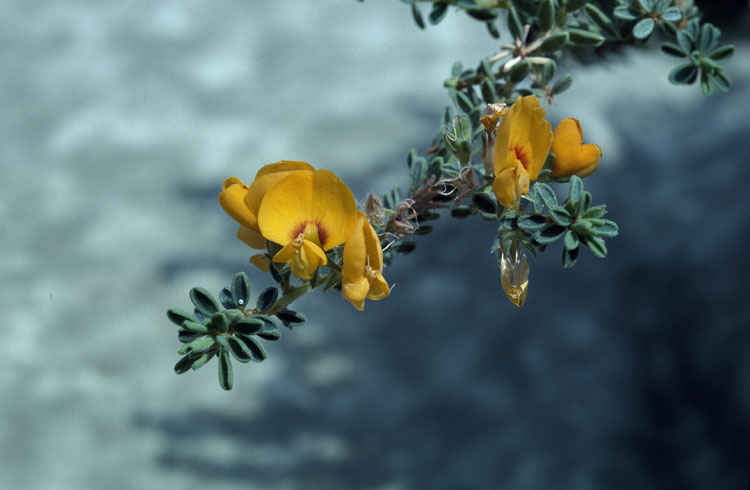
- In the Australian National Botanic Gardens

Scientific classification
- Kingdom: Plantae
- Clade: Tracheophytes
- Clade: Angiosperms
- Clade: Eudicots
- Clade: Rosids
- Order: Fabales
- Family: Fabaceae
- Subfamily: Faboideae
- Genus: Pultenaea
- Species: P. maritima

Binomial name
- Pultenaea maritima de Kok

= Pultenaea maritima =

Coastal bush-pea

Species of flowering plant

Pultenaea maritima, commonly known as coastal bush-pea or coastal headland pea, is a species of flowering plant in the family Fabaceae and is endemic to eastern Australia. It is a prostrate, mat-forming shrub with elliptic, or oblong to spatula-shaped leaves and pea-like flowers.

== Description ==
Pultenaea maritima is a prostrate, mat-forming shrub with softly-hairy stems. The leaves are arranged alternately along the stems, elliptic or oblong to spatula-shaped, 3.5–5 mm (0.14–0.20 in) long and 1.8–2.8 mm (0.071–0.110 in) wide with stipules 1.1–2 mm (0.043–0.079 in) long at the base, and with the edges curved downwards. The flowers are arranged in groups near the ends of branchlets and are 6.5–10 mm (0.26–0.39 in) long, each flower on a pedicel about 0.5 mm (0.020 in) long. The sepals are hairy and 3.8–5 mm (0.15–0.20 in) long with hairy bracteoles 3.0–3.3 mm (0.12–0.13 in) long at the base of the sepal tube. Flowering mainly occurs from August to March and the fruit is a pod about 5 mm (0.20 in) long.

== Taxonomy and naming ==
Pultenaea maritima was first formally described in 2002 by Rogier Petrus Johannes de Kok in Australian Systematic Botany from specimens collected in Woolgoolga in 1982. The specific epithet (maritima) means "growing by the sea".

== Distribution and habitat ==
Coastal bush-pea grows in grassland, shrubland and heath on exposed coastal headland from south-eastern Queensland to Newcastle in New South Wales.

== Conservation status ==
This pultenaea is classified as "vulnerable" under the New South Wales Government Biodiversity Conservation Act 2016.
