= Turimetta Beach =

Beach in Australia

Coordinates: 33°42′S 151°18′E

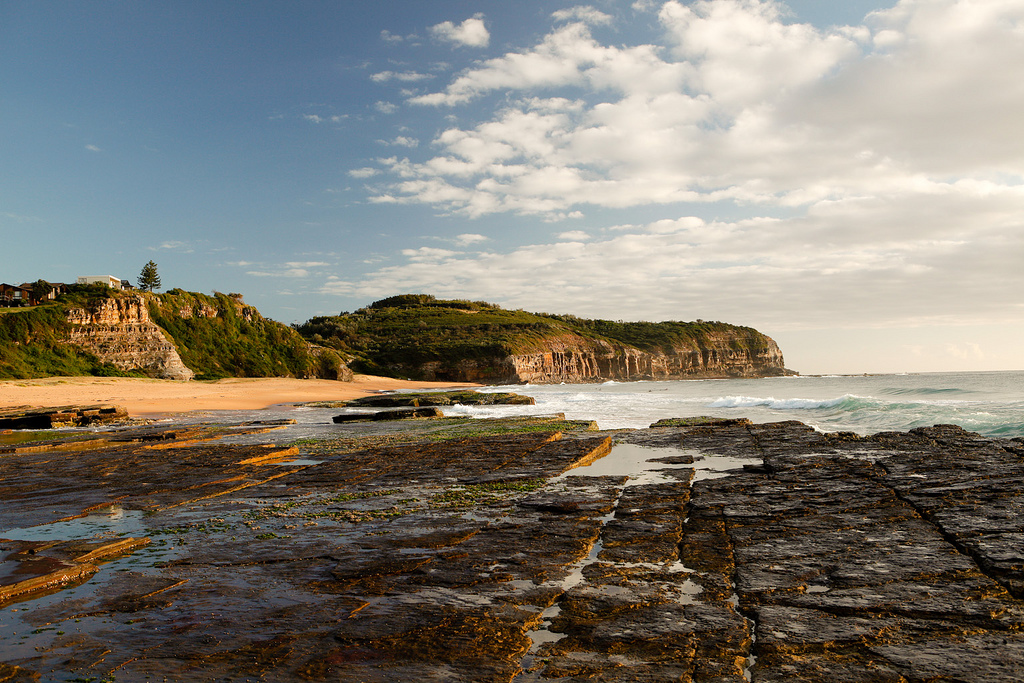
Turimetta Beach

Turimetta Beach is a beach in Sydney's Northern Beaches. It is 350 metres long and is backed by steep bluffs. Swimming can be hazardous because of rips that usually form at the centre and both ends of the beach. The beach is not patrolled by lifeguards. Turimetta is more often than not a swimmers' beach only. The surf quality is poor and surfers usually frequent North Narrabeen Beach to the south or Warriewood Beach to the north.

In 2016, a swimmer drowned in the surf and a 14-year-old boy required rescue from the rocks closer to the northern end of the beach.

The headland is a popular rock fishing spot so many shark sightings, both confirmed and unconfirmed, have occurred.
