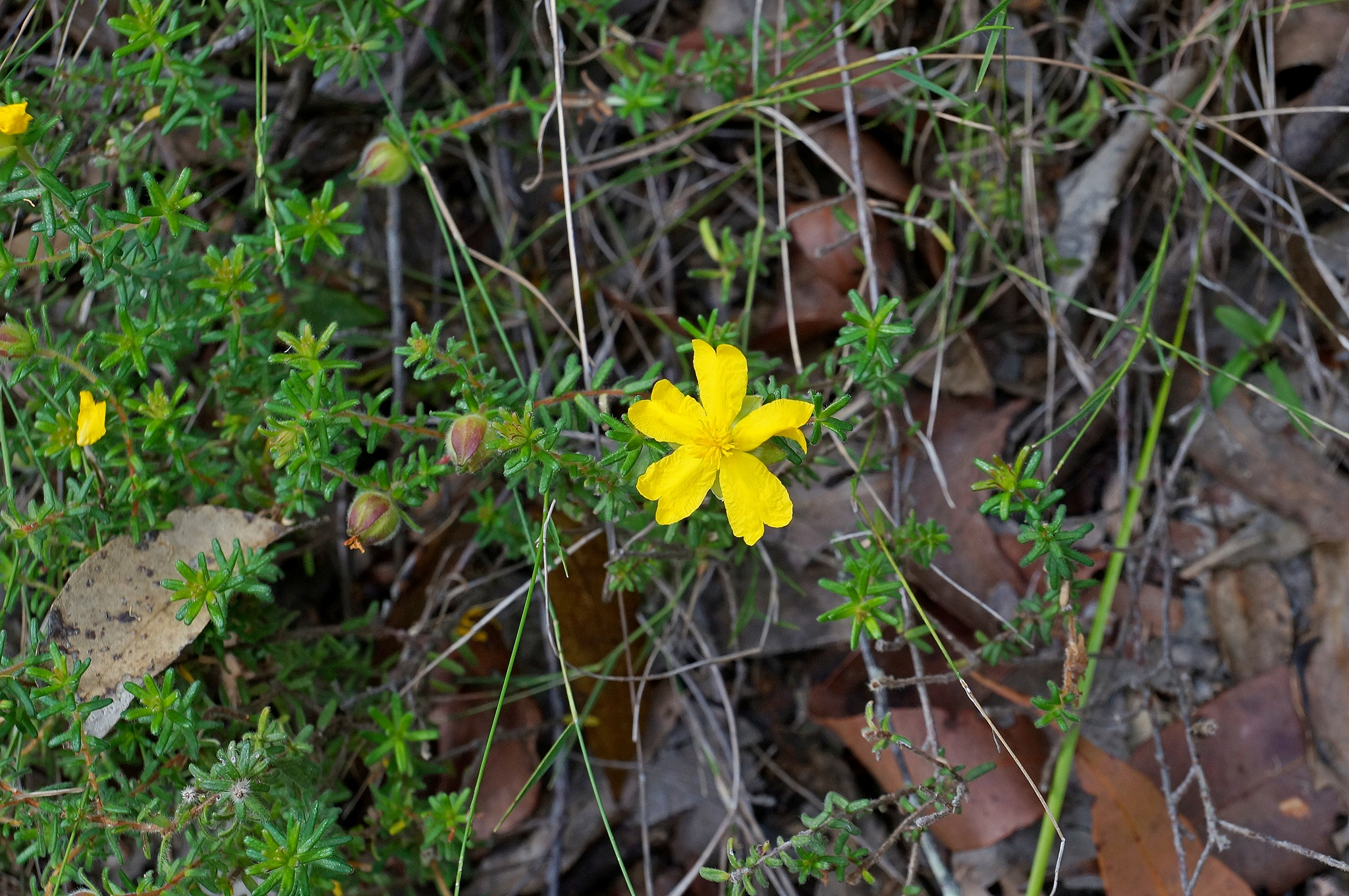
- In D'Aguilar National Park

Scientific classification
- Kingdom: Plantae
- Clade: Tracheophytes
- Clade: Angiosperms
- Clade: Eudicots
- Order: Dilleniales
- Family: Dilleniaceae
- Genus: Hibbertia
- Species: H. vestita

Binomial name
- Hibbertia vestita A.Cunn. ex Benth.

= Hibbertia vestita =

Species of shrub

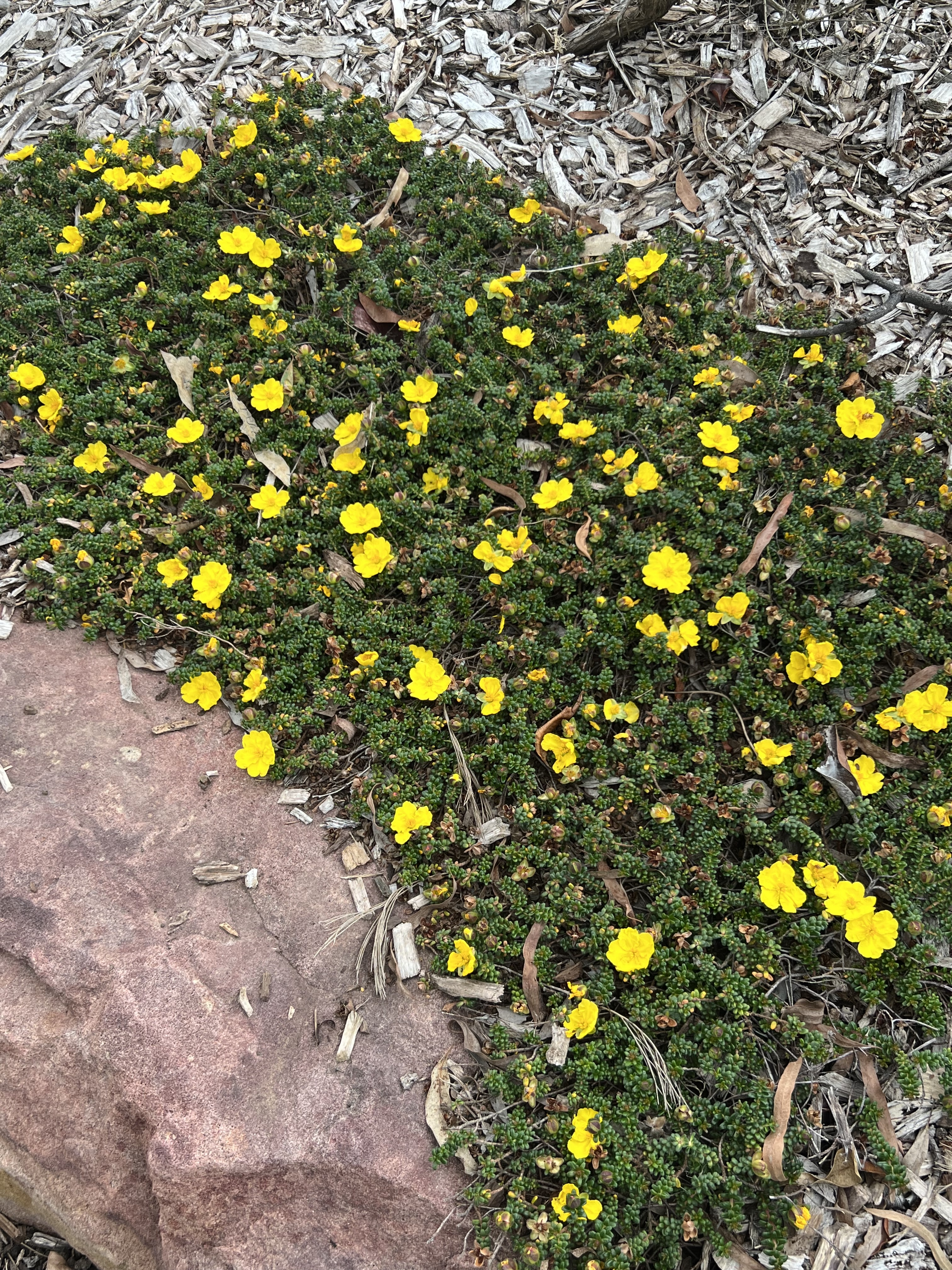
Habit

Hibbertia vestita, commonly known as hairy guinea-flower, is a species of flowering plant in the family Dilleniaceae and is endemic to eastern Australia. It is a small shrub with foliage covered with simple hairs, usually linear leaves, and yellow flowers with 22 to 43 stamens with many staminodes arranged around three hairy carpels.

== Description ==
Hibbertia vestita is a prostrate shrub that typically grows to a height of up to 30 cm (12 in) and has foliage covered with simple hairs, the leaves sometimes becoming glabrous as they age. The leaves are linear to more or less oblong or lance-shaped, 3.5–8 mm (0.14–0.31 in) long and 0.6–2.0 mm (0.024–0.079 in) wide on a petiole 0.2–0.6 mm (0.0079–0.0236 in) long. The flowers are arranged on the ends of branchlets and are sessile or on a peduncle up to 4 mm (0.16 in) long, with lance-shaped, leaf-like bracts 2.5–4.0 mm (0.098–0.157 in) long at the base. The five sepals are joined at the base, the three outer sepal lobes 6–8 mm (0.24–0.31 in) long and 3.0–4.5 mm (0.12–0.18 in) wide, and the inner lobes slightly shorter. The five petals are broadly egg-shaped with the narrower end towards the base, yellow, up to 12.5 mm (0.49 in) long with two lobes on the end. There are 22 to 43 stamens and many staminodes arranged around three hairy carpels, each carpel with four to six ovules. Flowering occurs in most months.

== Taxonomy ==
Hibbertia vestita was first formally described in 1863 by George Bentham from an unpublished description by Allan Cunningham, Bentham's description published in Flora Australiensis. The specific epithet (vestita) means "covered".

Bentham also described variety thymifolia in the same edition of Flora Australiensis, and its name and that of the autonym are accepted by the Australian Plant Census:

- Hibbertia vestita var. thymifolia Benth. has shorter leaves than those of the autonym, and the end often curves downwards;
- Hibbertia vestita Benth. var. vestita.

== Distribution and habitat ==
Hairy guinea-flower grows in heath in near-coastal area and in forest in areas further inland in south-east Queensland and north-eastern New South Wales. Variety thymifolia is restricted to exposed headlands in the same area.
