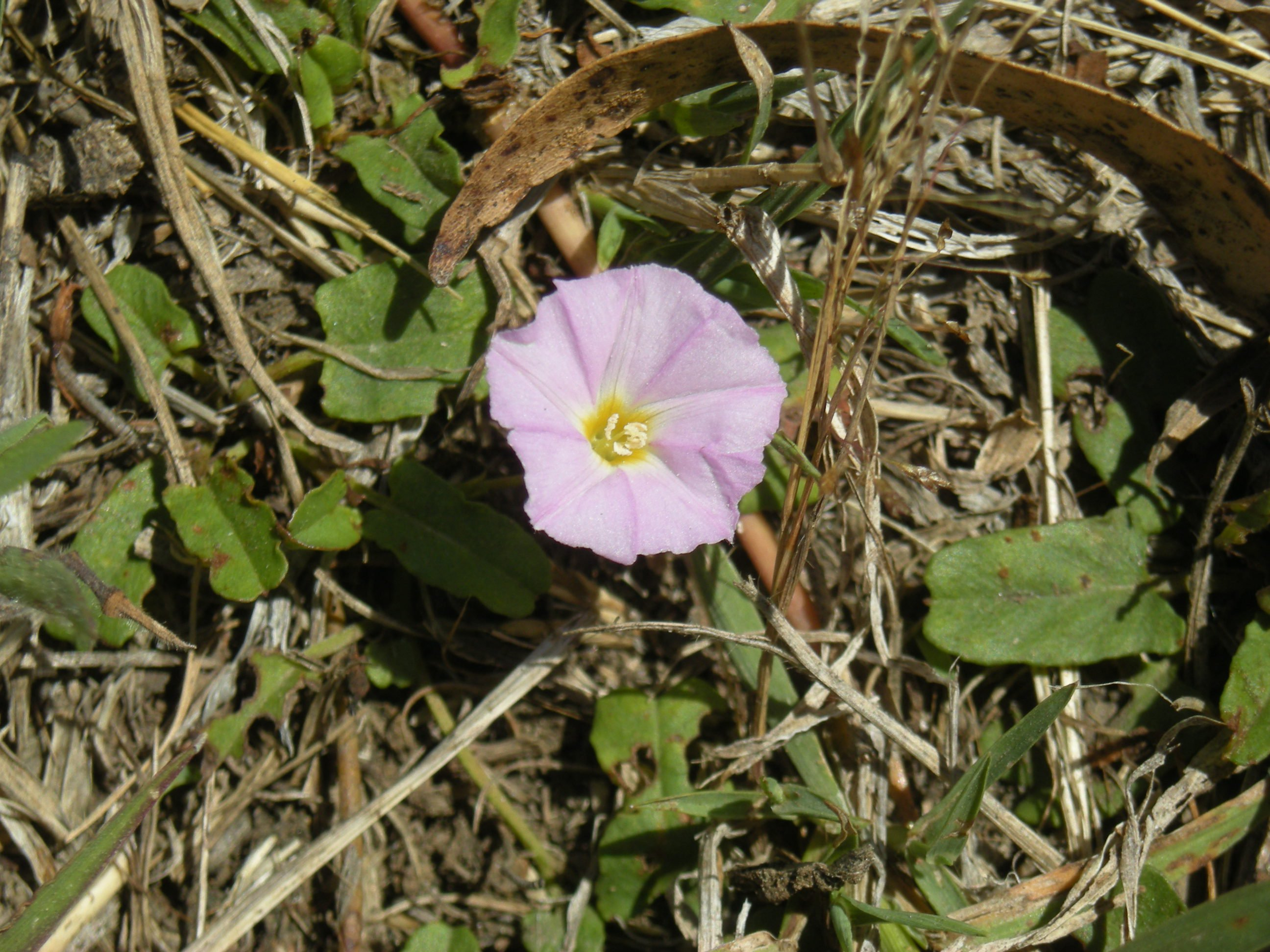

Scientific classification
- Kingdom: Plantae
- Clade: Tracheophytes
- Clade: Angiosperms
- Clade: Eudicots
- Clade: Asterids
- Order: Solanales
- Family: Convolvulaceae
- Genus: Polymeria
- Species: P. calycina

Binomial name
- Polymeria calycina R.Br.

= Polymeria calycina =

Species of plant

Polymeria calycina, also known as slender bindweed, is a species of prostrate herbaceous vine native to northern and Eastern Australia. The species grows in savanna woodlands, open forests and occasionally grasslands.
