= List of beaches in Australia =

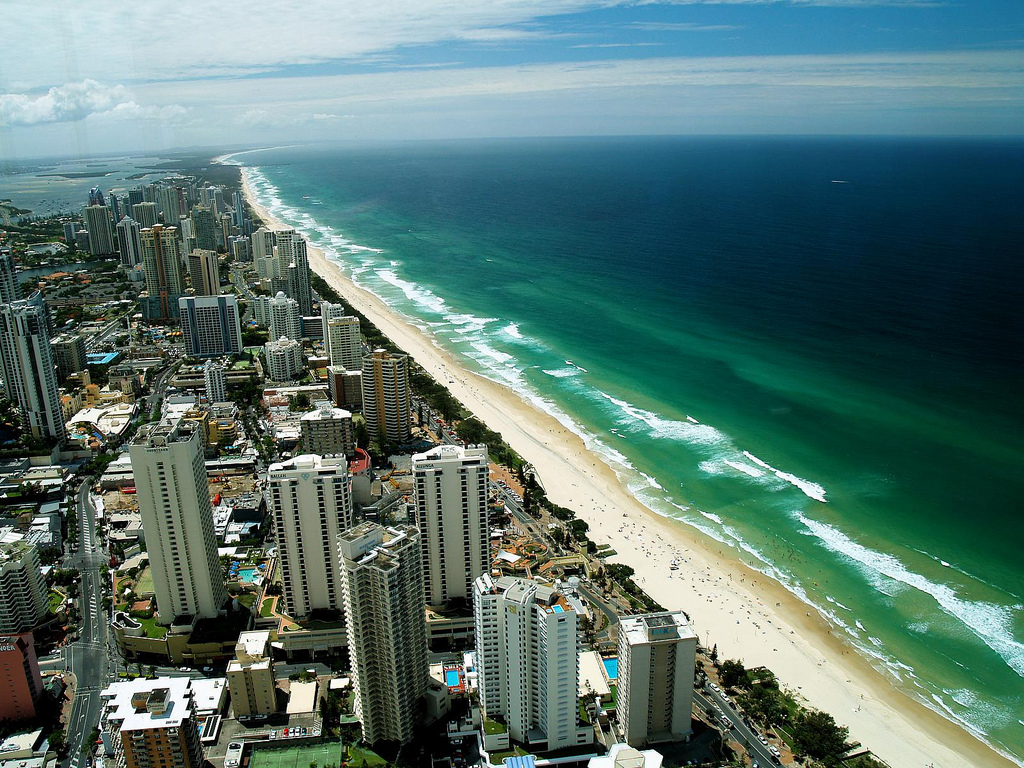
The Gold Coast consists of 70 kilometres (43 mi) of coastline with some of the most popular surf breaks.

Beaches in Australia are in abundance due to the fact that Australia is entirely surrounded by the ocean. Beaches are popular destinations among the country's local population, and travellers alike, as over 85% of Australians live on the coast and most of Australia falls under the warm temperate and subtropical climate zones. Australia has a prominent beach culture, which is often considered part of its national identity, with television shows, movies, and songs being set in or relating to beaches. This page features a list of beaches in Australia.

The longest beach in Australia is the 194 km (121 mi) long sandy beach running down the outer side of the Younghusband Peninsula in South Australia, commonly referred to as The Coorong. It runs from the Murray mouth to Cape Jaffa.

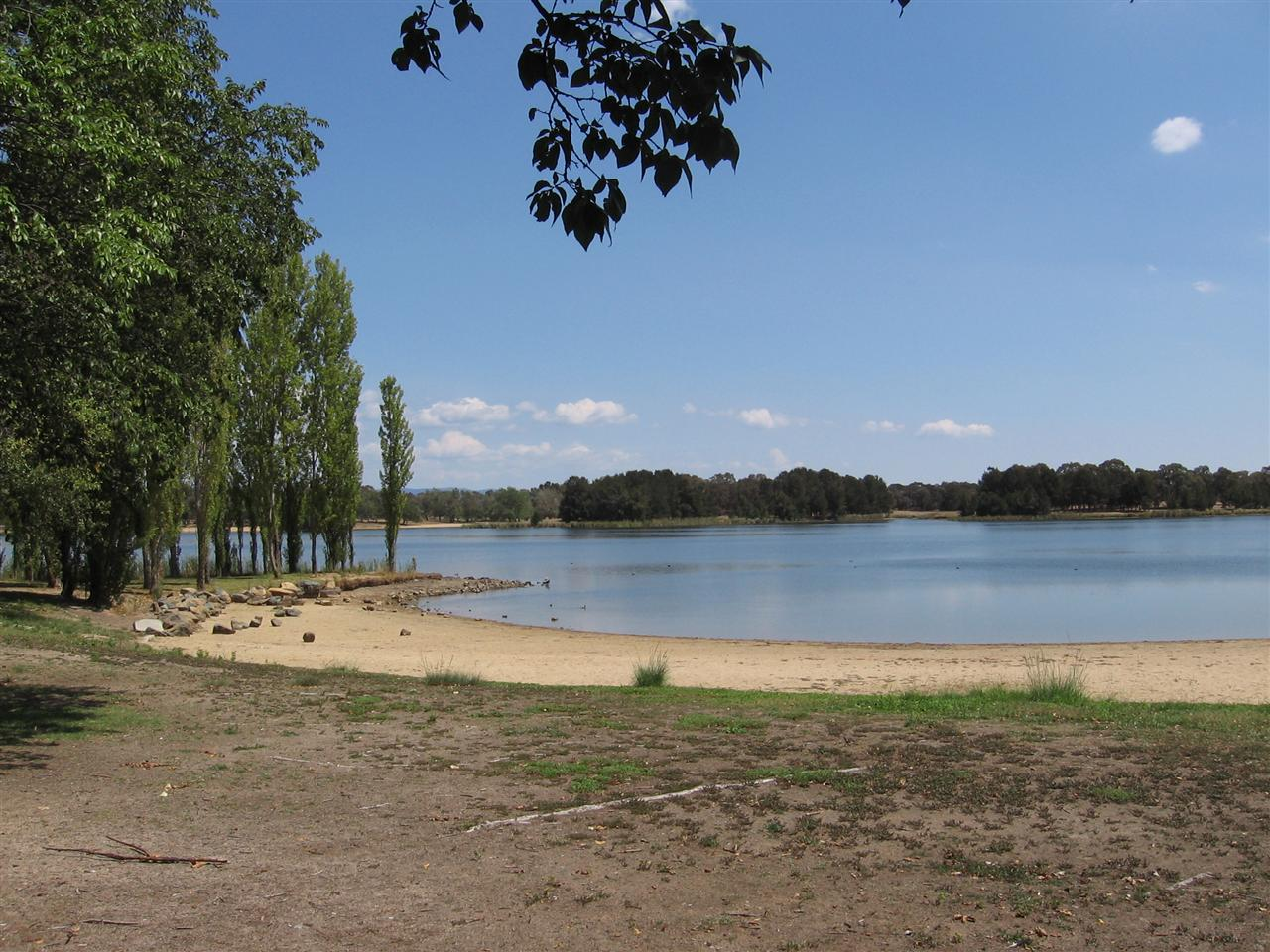
Nengi Bamir Beach, on Lake Ginninderra

== Australian Capital Territory & Jervis Bay Territory ==
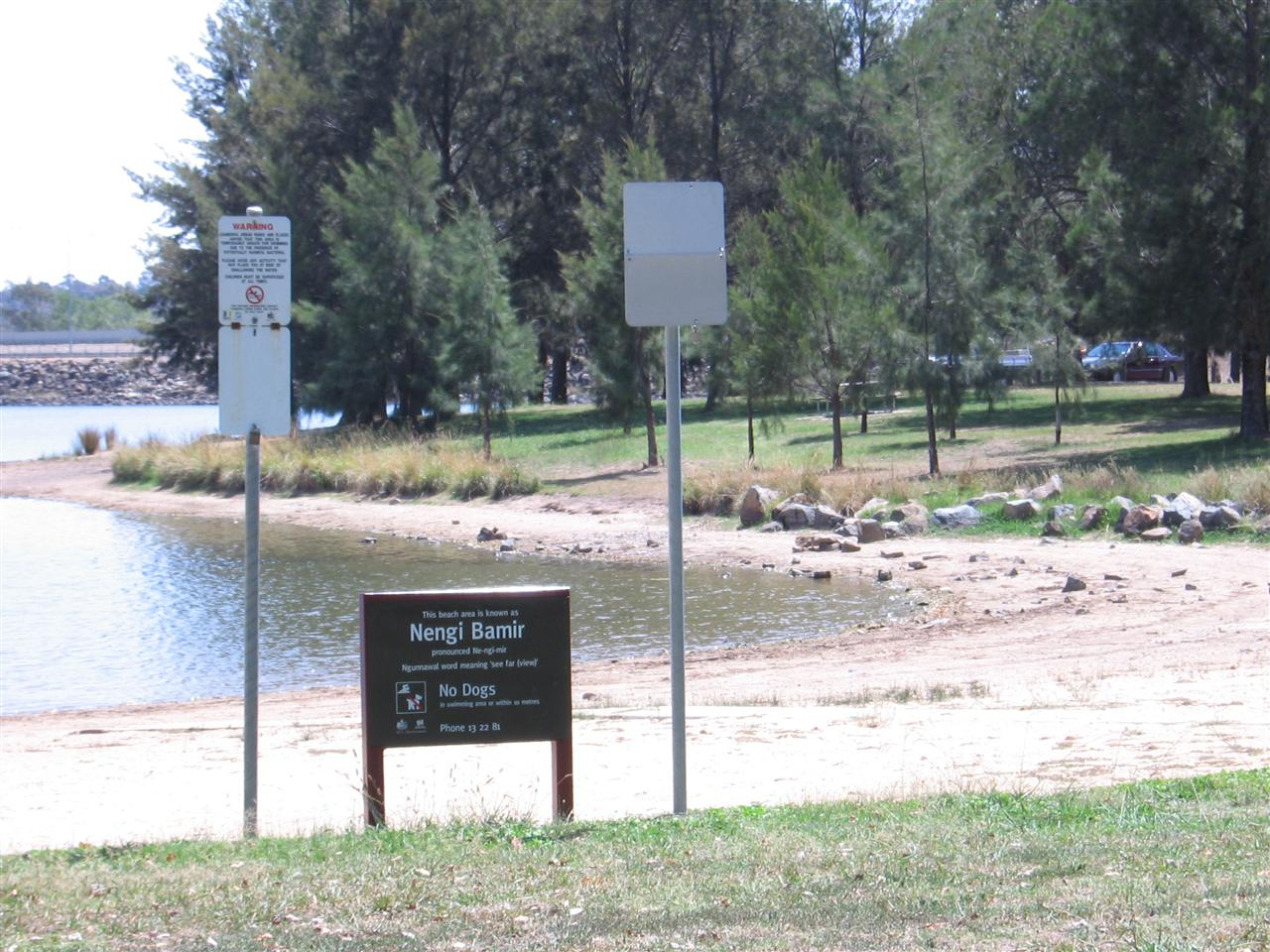
Nengi Bamir Beach

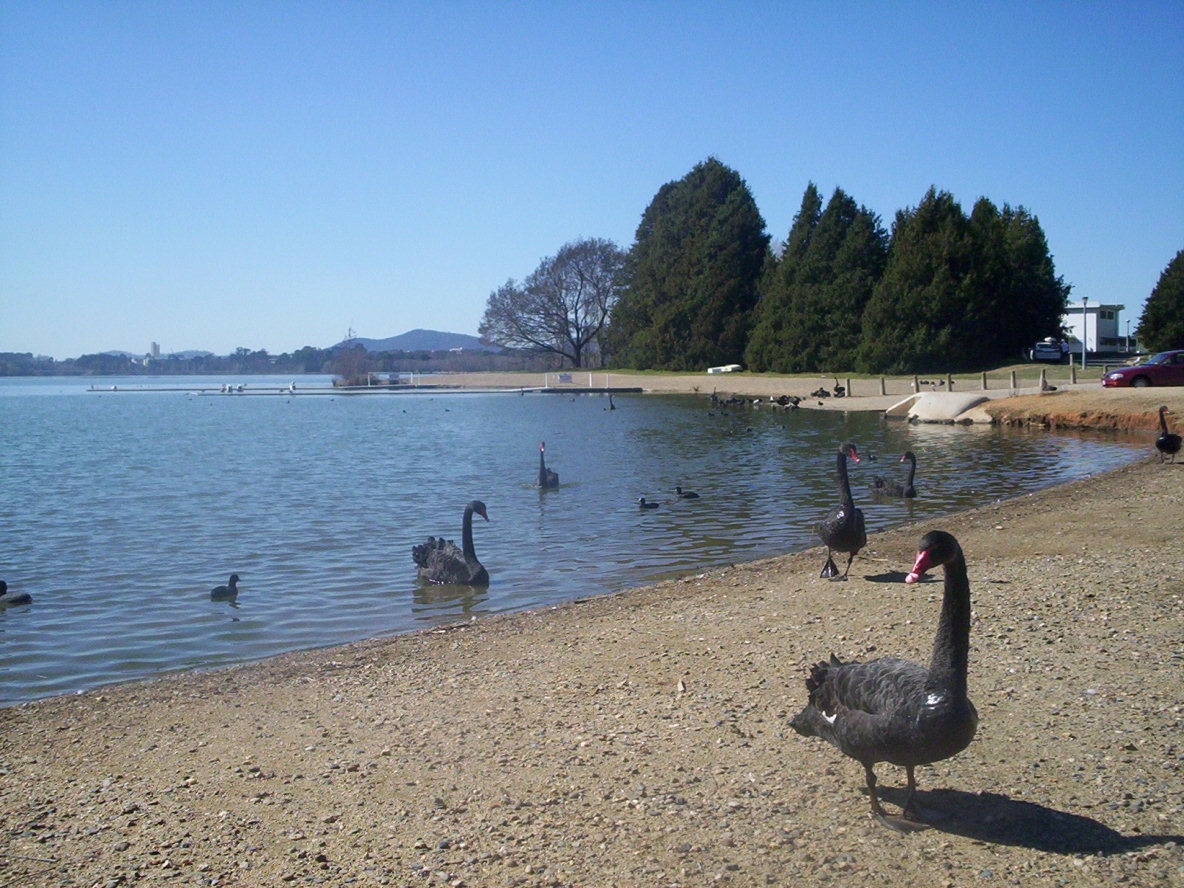
Swans on Orana Beach

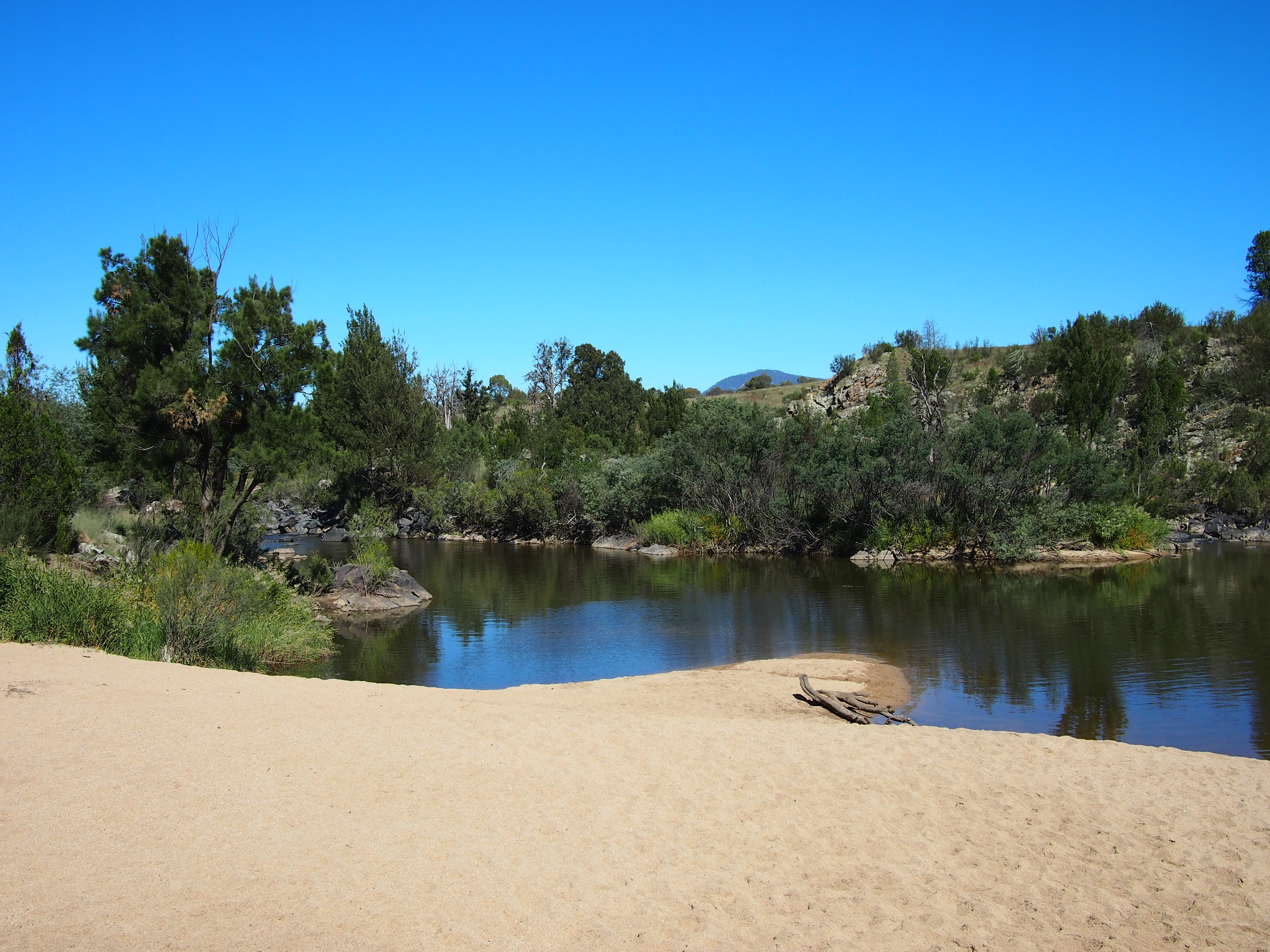
Pine Island Beach in 2013

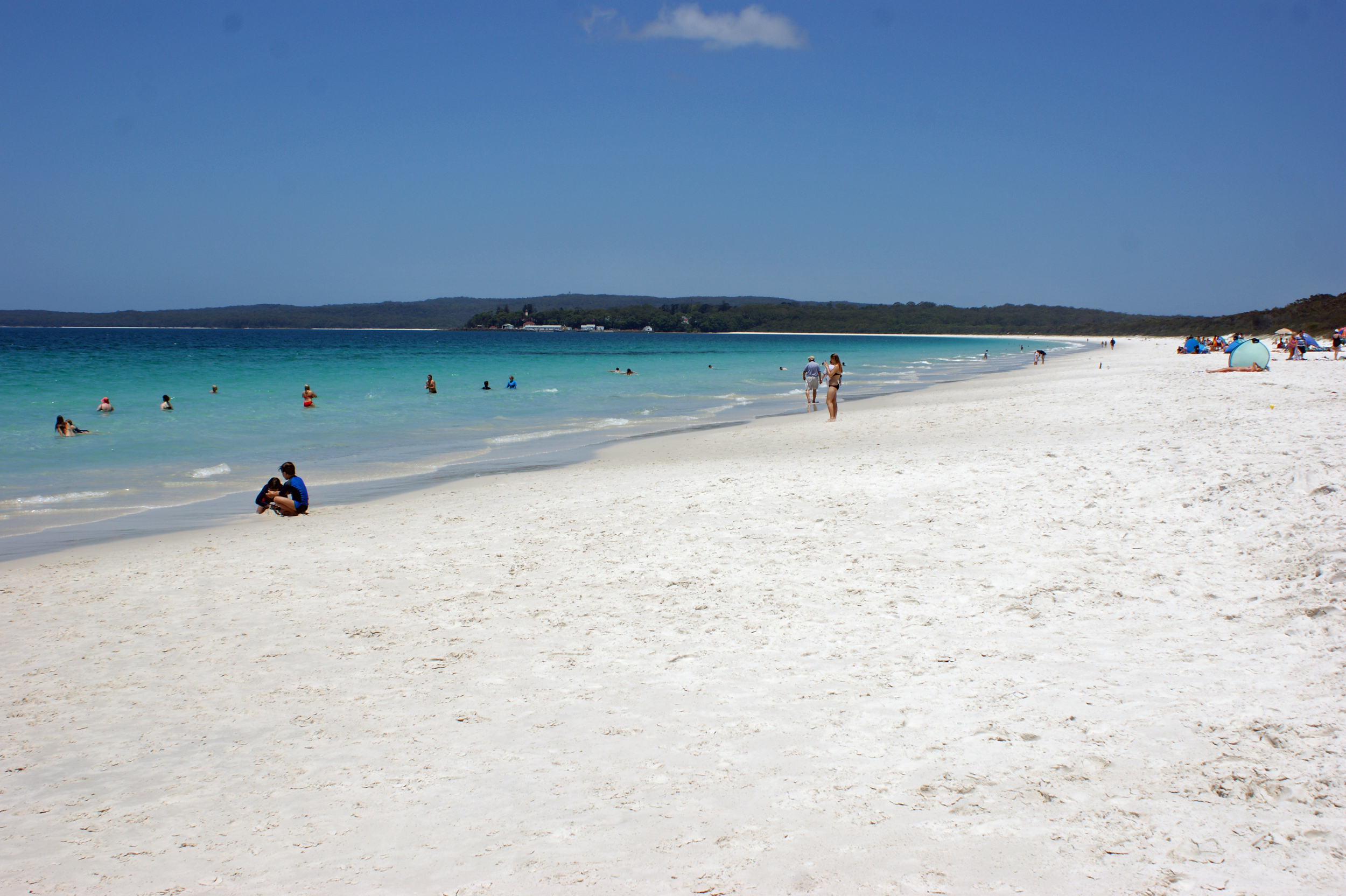
Hyams Beach in Jervis Bay, which features fine, radiantly white sand.

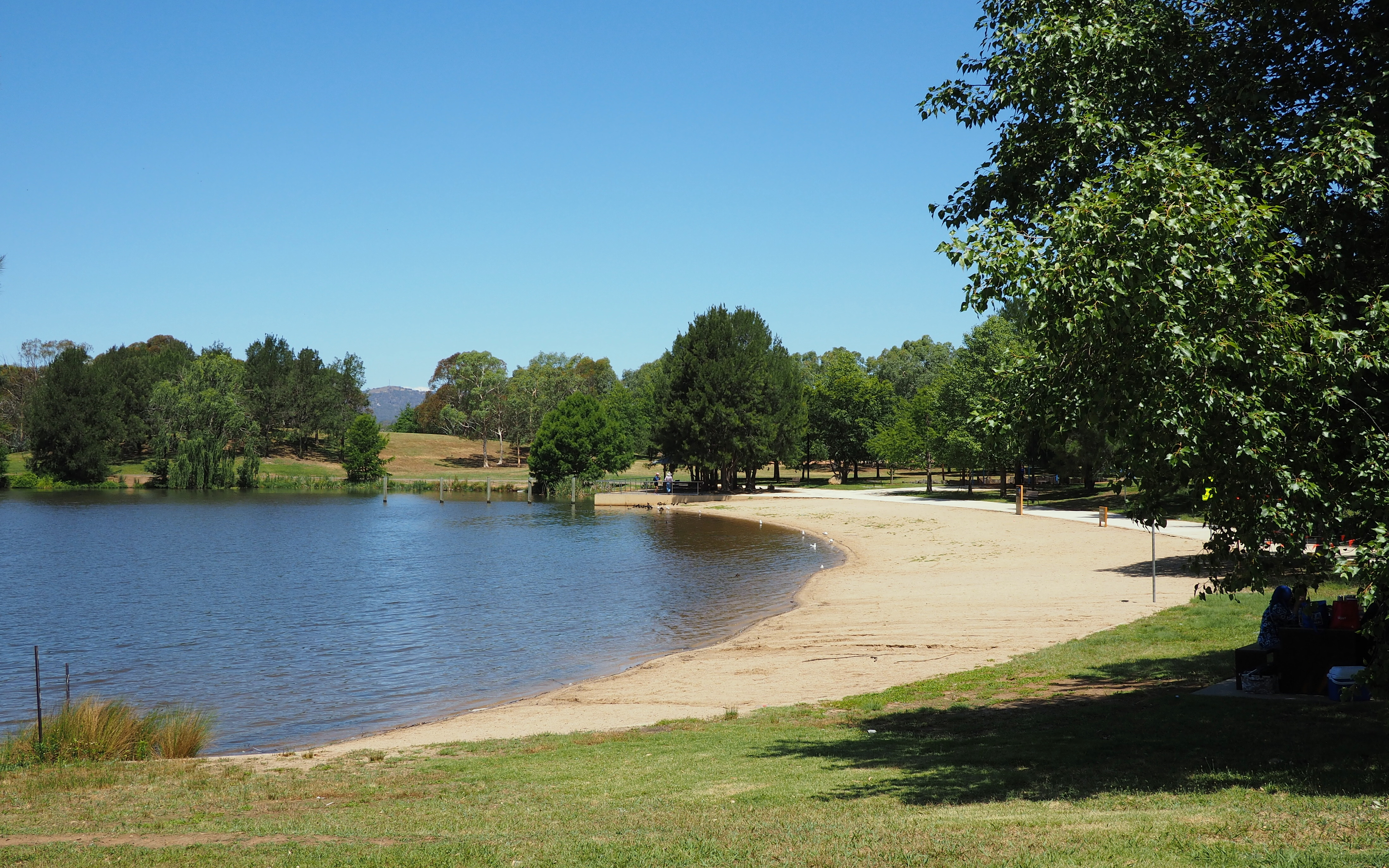
Tuggeranong Town Park Beach in 2015.

- Banana Beach
- Bimbi Beach
- Bherrewhere Beach (Five Mile Beach)
- Border Beach
- Bullocks Hoof
- Captains Beach
- Casuarina Sands
- Cave Beach
- Dulwa Beach
- Gummiuk Beach
- Hyams Beach
- Iluka Beach
- Kitty's Beach
- Mundang Beach
- Murray's Beach
- Nengi Bamir Beach
- Nguru Beach
- Orana Beach
- Pine Island Beach
- Steamers Beach
- Summercloud Beach
- Tarcoola Beach
- Tharwa Sands
- Tuggeranong Town Park Beach
- Wally Beach
- Whiting Beach
- Yarralumla Beach
- Yerra Beach

== New South Wales ==
=== Sydney ===
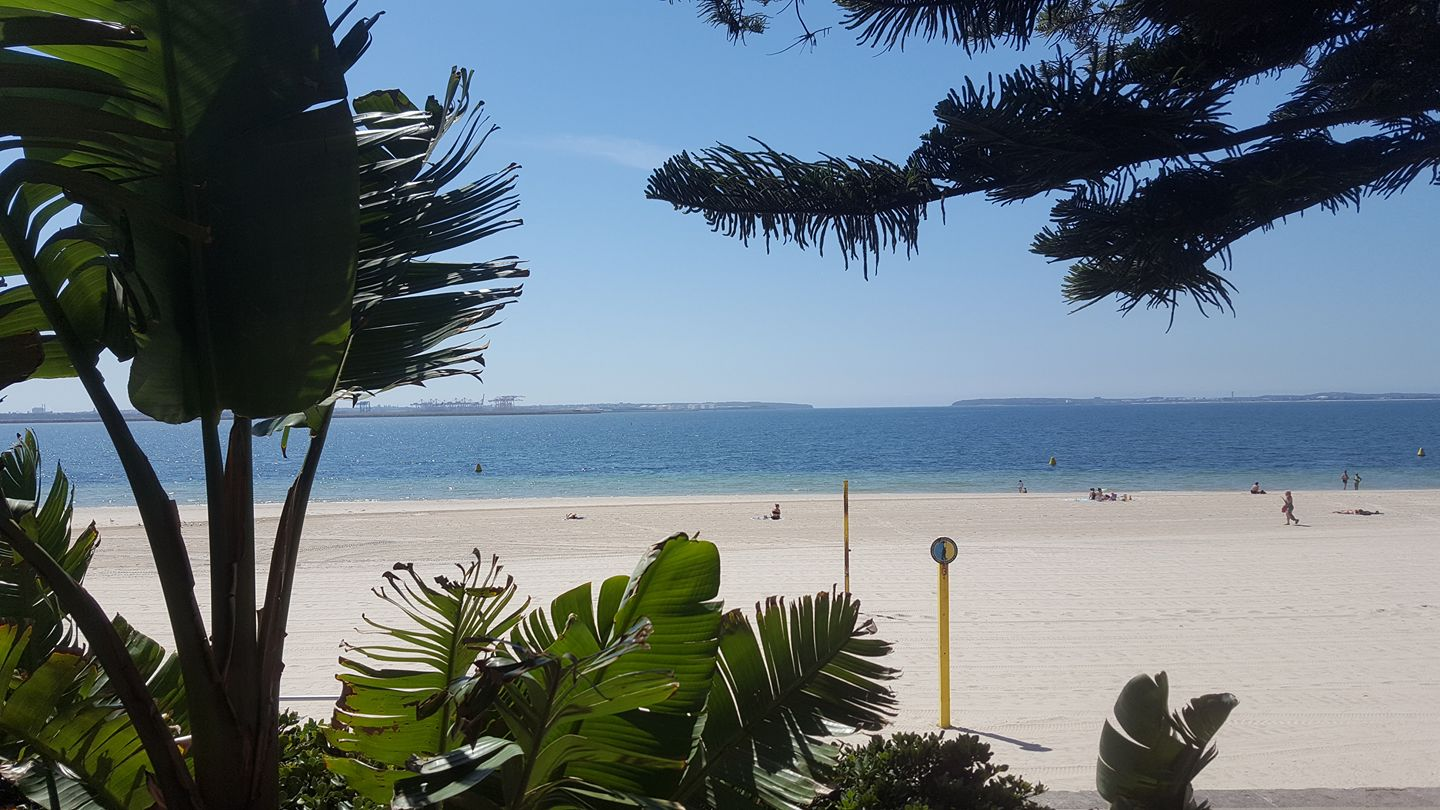
Lady Robinsons Beach in Brighton-Le-Sands.

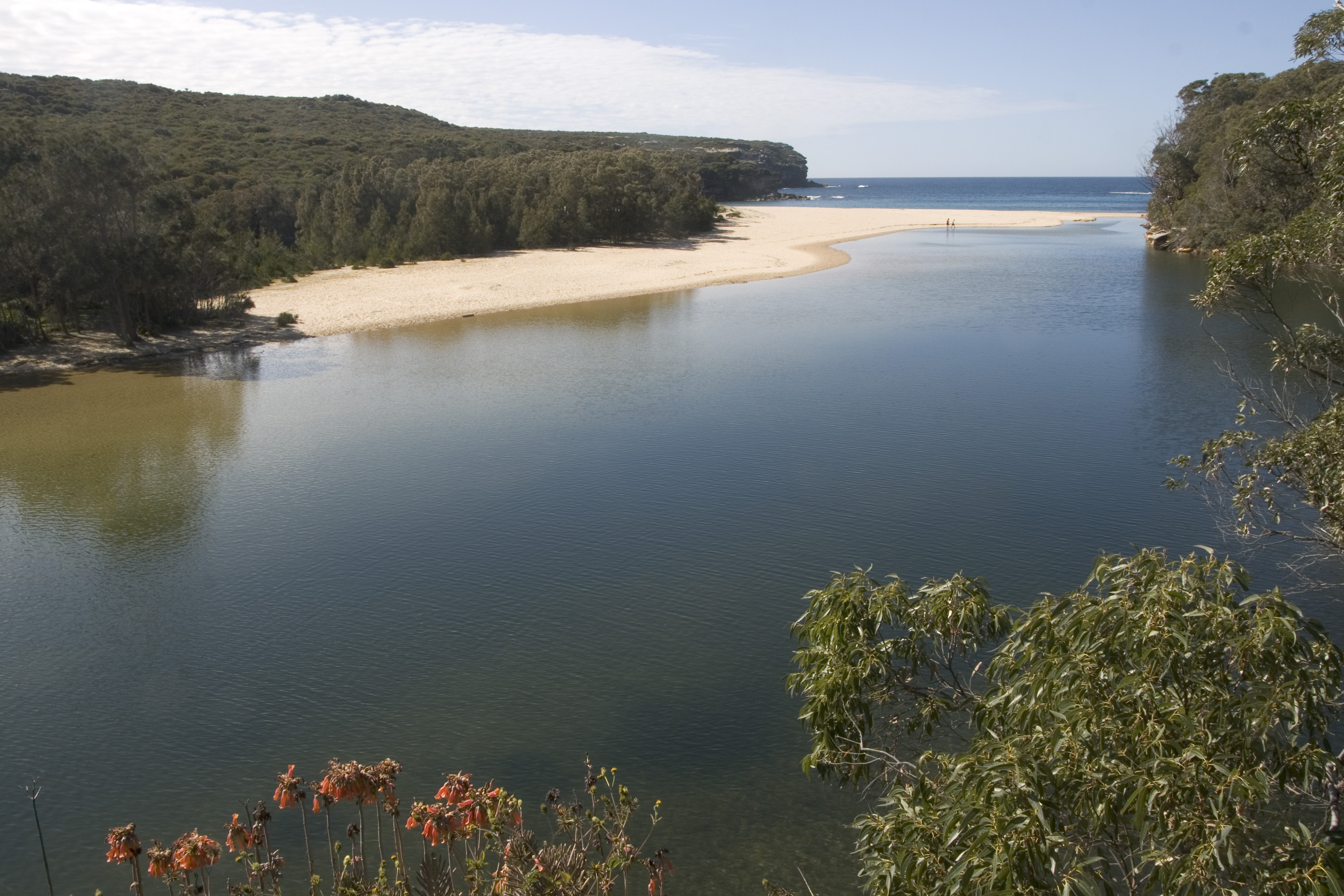
Wattamolla Beach in Royal National Park which features a lagoon.

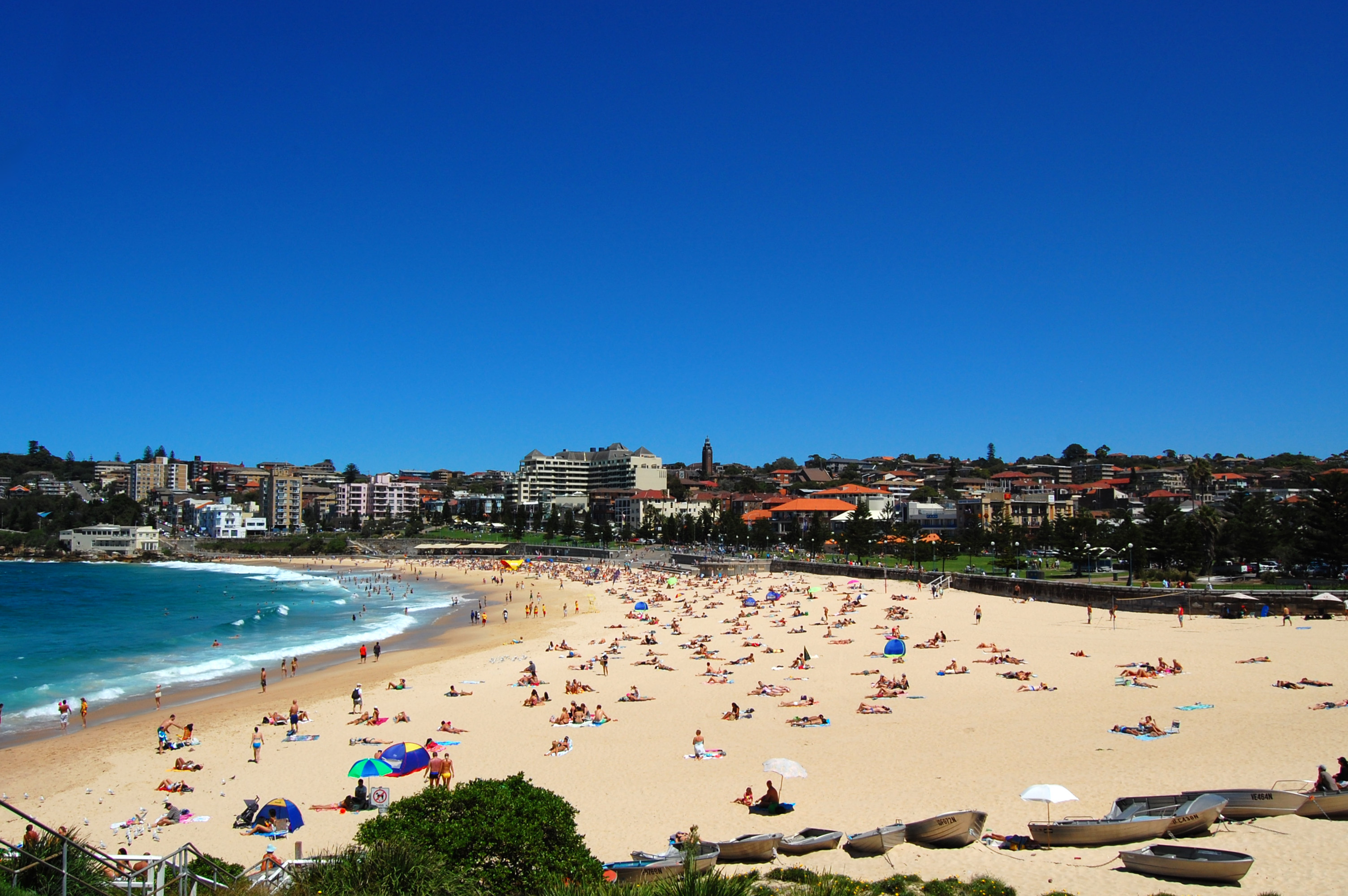
Coogee Beach, view from Dolphin Point at the northern end

- Avalon Beach (Northern Beaches)
- Lady Robinsons Beach
- Bondi Beach
- Coogee Beach
- Cronulla Beach
- Shark Island, Cronulla Beach
- Dee Why Beach
- Manly Beach
- Maroubra Beach
- Palm Beach
- Tamarama
- Wattamolla
- Boat Harbour
- Bents Basin
- Lake Parramatta
- Wanda Beach
- Elouera Beach
- Obelisk Beach
- North Cronulla
- Whale Beach
- Ramsgate Beach
- Little Manly Beach
- Greenhills Beach
- Currawong Beach
- Fairy Bower Beach
- Freshwater Beach
- Garie Beach
- Great Mackerel Beach
- Marley Beach
- Turimetta Beach
- Bilgola Beach
- Bronte Beach
- Curl Curl
- Collaroy

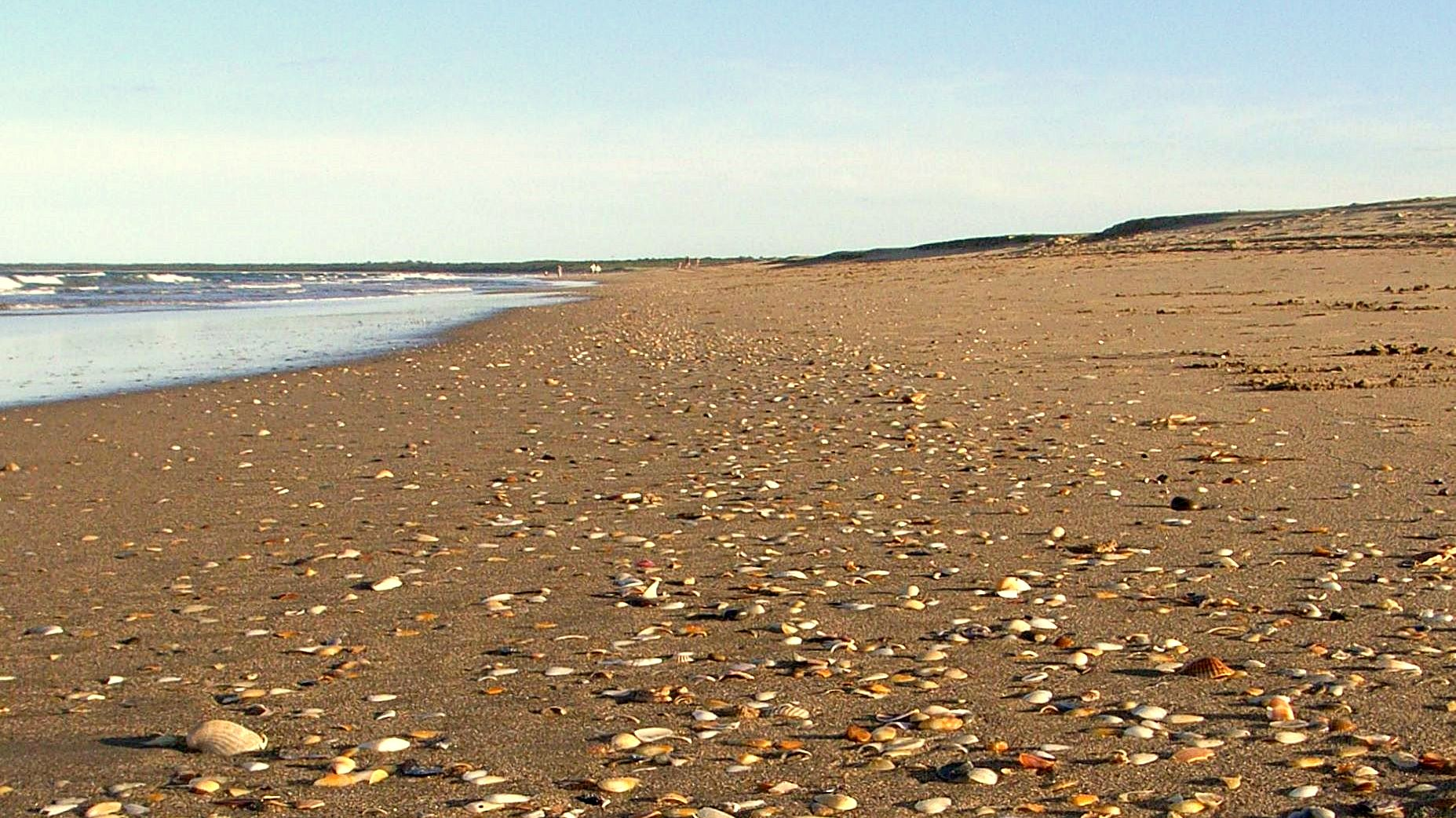
Seashells on Seven Mile Beach in the Kiama region.

=== Other regions ===
- Pambula Beach
- Jones Beach
- Duranbah Beach
- Lighthouse Beach
- Angels Beach
- Hyams Beach
- Bar Beach
- Blueys Beach
- Boomerang Beach
- Bream Beach
- Burgess Beach
- Taylors Beach
- Corindi Beach
- Sawtell Beach
- Shelly Beach
- Murray's Beach, Sawtell
- Byron Bay
- Seven Mile Beach
- South Golden Beach
- Stockton Beach
- Werri Beach

== Northern Territory ==
- Mindil Beach, Northern Territory
- Gunn Point Beach, Northern Territory

== Queensland ==
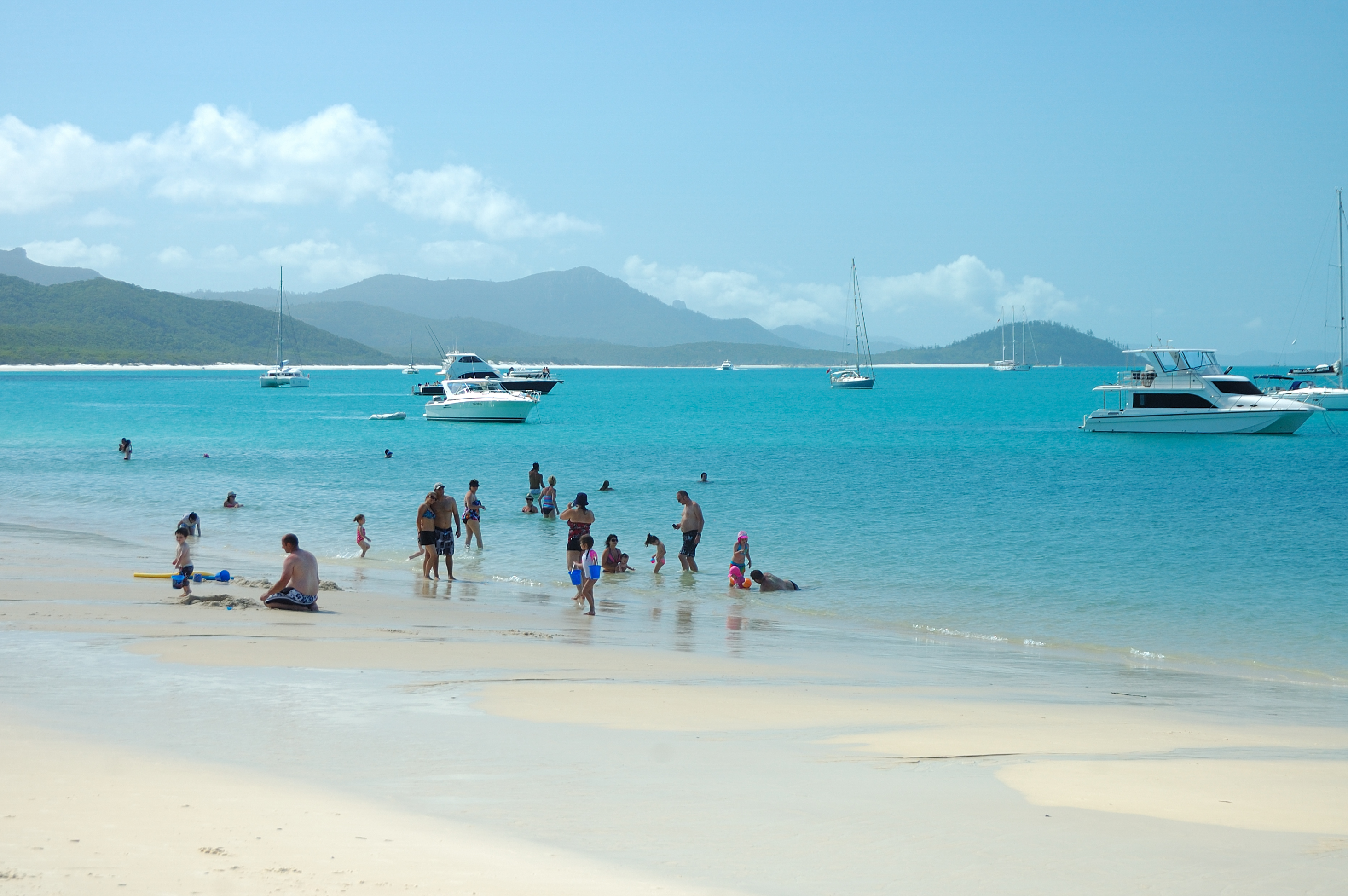
Whitehaven Beach in Whitsunday Island.

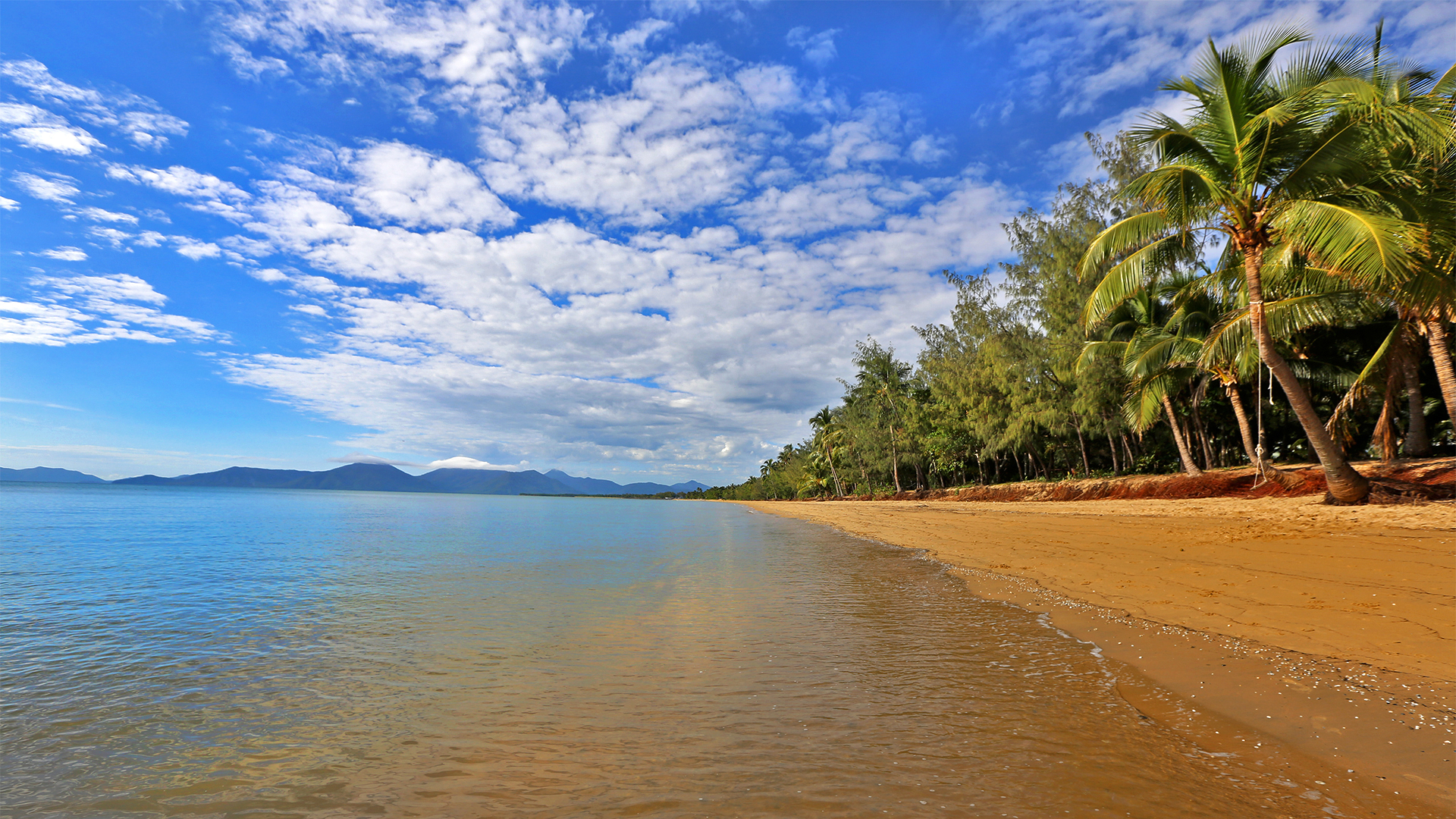
Holloways Beach in Cairns.

- Mermaid Beach
- Palm Cove
- Four Mile Beach
- Rainbow Beach
- Sunrise Beach
- Sunshine Beach
- Surfers Paradise
- Main Beach
- Southport Spit
- Snapper Rocks
- Coolum Beach
- Cowley Beach
- Shelley Beach
- Bramston Beach
- Airlie Beach
- Greenmount Beach
- Holloways Beach
- Kewarra Beach
- Kings Beach
- Kinka Beach
- Marcus Beach
- Mission Beach
- Newell Beach
- Nudgee Beach
- Palm Beach
- Castaways Beach
- Teewah Beach
- Trinity Beach
- Whitehaven Beach
- Wonga Beach

== South Australia ==
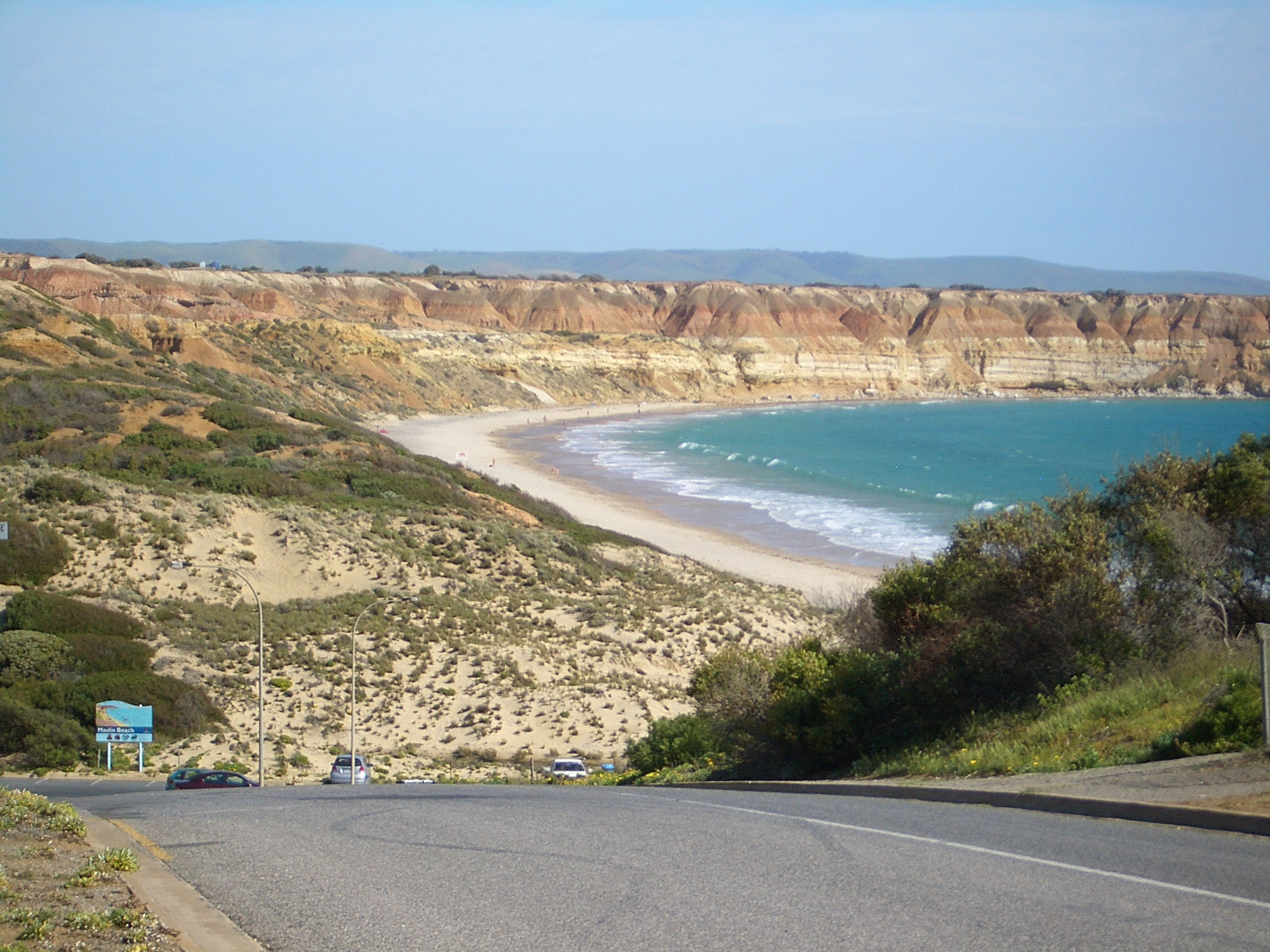
Maslin Beach in the City of Onkaparinga in Adelaide.

- Aldinga Beach
- Baudin Beach
- Christies Beach
- The Coorong, the longest in Australia
- Henley Beach
- Island Beach
- Maslin Beach
- Middle Beach
- O'Sullivan Beach
- Sellicks Beach
- West Beach

== Victoria ==
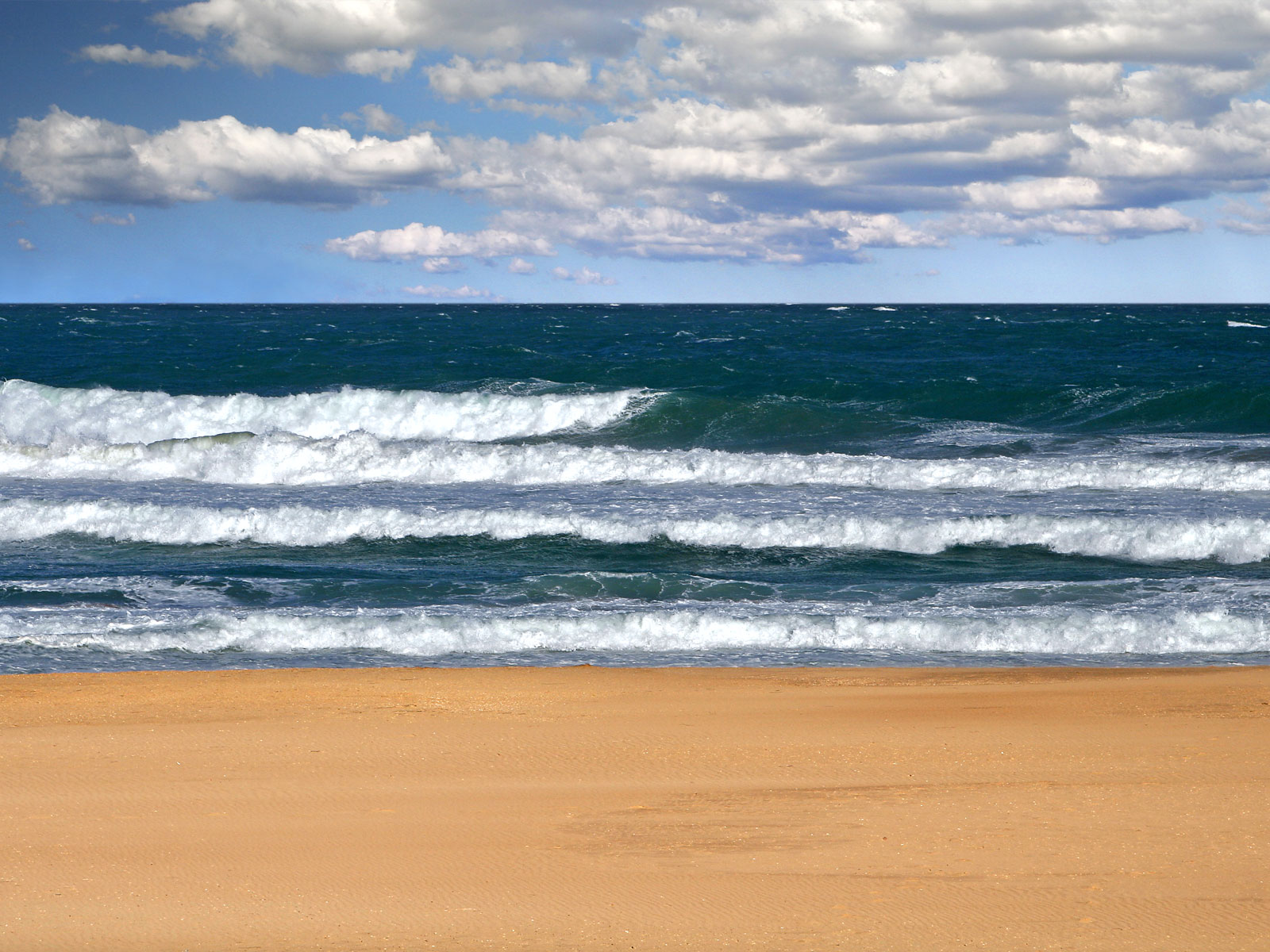
Ninety Mile Beach in East Gippsland.

- Altona Beach
- Balnarring Beach
- Bells Beach, Torquay
- Bridgewater Bay
- Brighton
- Cheviot Beach
- Discovery Bay
- Eastern Beach
- Manns Beach
- Mentone Beach
- Ninety Mile Beach
- Point Impossible Beach
- Safety Beach
- St Andrews Beach
- St Kilda Beach
- Southside Beach
- Sunnyside North Beach
- Thirteenth Beach
- Williamstown Beach
- Woodside Beach
- Wreck Beach

== Western Australia ==
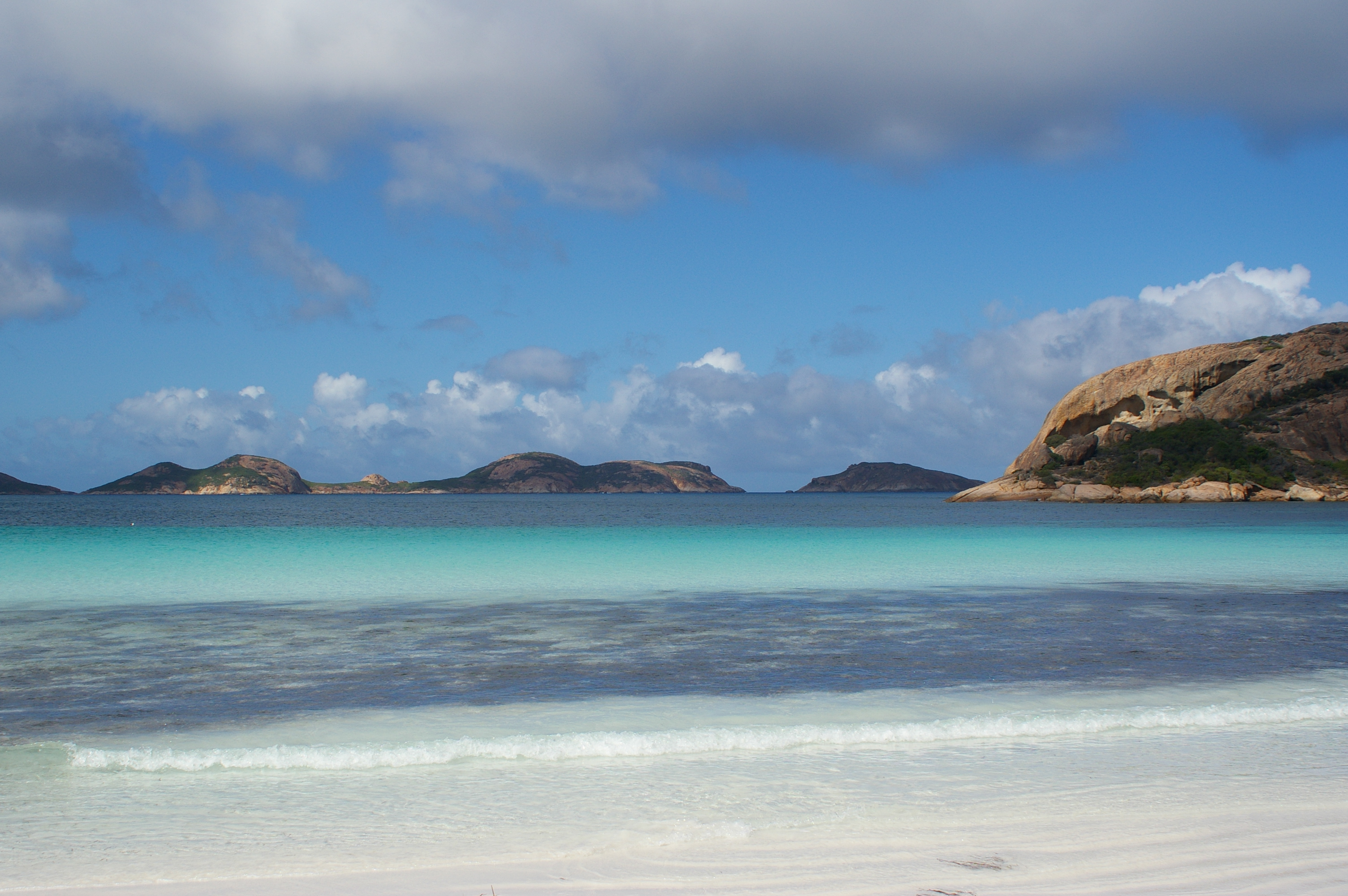
Lucky Bay in southwest coast of Western Australia is another beach in the country known to have pure white sand.

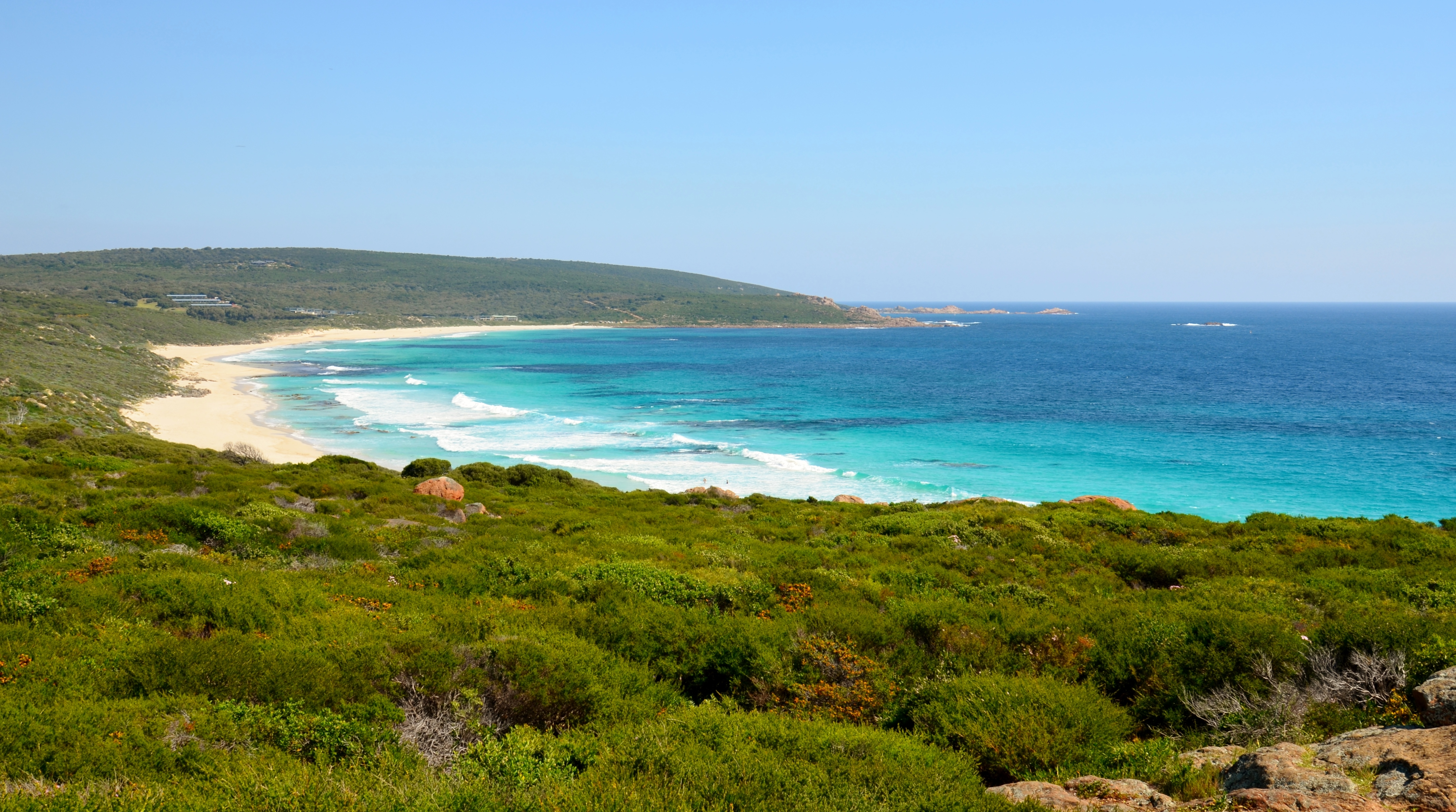
Smiths Beach in Yallingup

- Cable Beach
- Cottesloe Beach
- Lucky Bay
- Floreat Beach
- City Beach
- Yallingup
- Coogee
- North Beach
- Eighty Mile Beach
- Bathers Beach
- Greens Pool
- Middleton Beach
- Elephant Rocks
- Nanarup Beach
- Ocean Beach
- Peppermint Grove Beach
- Preston Beach
- Shell Beach
- Sunset Beach
- Tarcoola Beach
- West Beach

== See also ==
- List of beaches
