= List of social nudity places in Oceania =

This is a list of social nudity places in Oceania for recreation. It includes free beaches (or clothing-optional beaches or nude beaches), swimming holes and lakes and some naturist resorts. It does not include resorts that allow women to sunbathe top-free, or where indigenous peoples maintain their customs regarding clothing.

== Australia ==
=== Australian Capital Territory ===
Kambah Pool

=== New South Wales ===
NSW so far has the largest quantity of nude beaches in the country. These beaches and resorts in New South Wales are legally nudist or clothing optional:

- Armands Beach, Bermagui
- Birdie Beach, Lake Munmorah
- Lady Bay Beach, Watsons Bay
- Cobblers Beach, Mosman
- Obelisk Beach, Mosman
- Samurai Beach, One Mile
- Werrong Beach, Royal National Park

The below beaches are regularly used by naturists, but nude bathing may not be legally protected:

- Little Congwong Beach, La Perouse
- Little Diggers Beach, Coffs Harbour
- Little Jibbon Beach, Royal National Park
- Myrtle Beach, Murramarang_National_Park

=== Northern Territory ===
- Casuarina Beach, Darwin

=== Queensland ===
This is the only mainland state without legally nude locations, current unofficial beaches are:

- Alexandria Bay near Noosa Heads is a popular spot with nudists and arguably the most tolerated nude beach.
- Cow Bay, two hours north of Cairns

=== South Australia ===
- Maslin Beach
- Stinky Beach, Nora Creina—adjacent to Sunland Nudist Holiday Resort

=== Tasmania ===
Tasmania Police in February 2016 said that it was illegal to swim or be in a public place without appropriate attire and patrols at Seven Mile Beach would be increased in response to the complaints.

Nudists use the following beaches:

- Bakers Beach (Note: Baker's beach location41°08′35″S 146°36′00″E)
- Nude Beach – section of beach naturally secluded by a rocky outcrop, beyond the south-western end of Hinsby Beach, Taroona (Note: location42°57′16″S 147°20′42″E)

=== Victoria ===
Victoria has over 2,000 km (1,242.7 mi) of coastline with hundreds of beaches. Three of those beaches are legal clothes-optional beaches:

- Sunnyside North Beach, Mount Eliza, Port Philip Bay on the Mornington Peninsula
- Point Impossible Beach, a clothing-optional beach located near Torquay
- Southside Beach, another clothing-optional beach located near Torquay

=== Western Australia ===
The following are legal nudist beaches in Western Australia:

- North Swanbourne Beach
- Warnbro Beach, Rockingham (Note: Location of Warnbro Beach, Warnbro 32°21′7″S 115°44′36″E)
- Mauritius Beach, Exmouth
- East Pretty Pool, Port Hedland (Note: Location of East Pretty Pool 20°18′57″S 118°39′05″E)
- Ten Mile Lagoon, Esperance

The following resort is Naturist:

- Sunseekers Nudist Club

== New Caledonia ==
Whilst topless sunbathing is popular in Nouméa, it is considered socially unacceptable outside of the city in other areas of New Caledonia. The only unofficial nude beach is Plage des Nudistes, which is located on Nouville peninsular near Nouméa. It is not well known by tourists and attracts mostly males.

== New Zealand ==
There is no law prohibiting nakedness in public. In cases of ‘public nakedness’ the police go to the Summary Offences Act 1981 and consider, S27 Obscene/Indecent exposure; S4 Offensive behaviour; or S4 Disorderly behaviour.

In 1991 an appeal to the High Court won and determined that the legal definition of 'offensive' was not met by mere nakedness, even in the presence of children, on the grounds that a reasonable person would "regard the conduct... as inappropriate, unnecessary, and in bad taste, but not arousing feelings of anger, disgust, or outrage." There had to be 'intent to offend'. Public nudity on beaches is generally not enforceable. There have been a number of successful legal challenges to being naked in a public area, including cycling and running, so long as there was no intent to offend

.

In 2012 a number of complaints regarding behavior at Auckland beaches led to warnings being issued by police at some which have a history of use by naturists. However, no official action was taken.

=== Beaches ===
==== North Island ====
===== Northland Region =====
- Maitai Bay, Karikari Peninsula
- Rarawa Beach near Ngataki
- Tapotupotu Bay
- Uretiti Beach (Note: Uretiti Beach, Northland 35°57′28″S 174°27′57″E)
- Waitata Bay, Russell

===== Auckland =====
- Fitzpatrick Bay (Note: Fitzpatrick Bay, Auckland 36°49′01″S 174°41′42″E)
- Herne Bay
- Karekare Beach
- Ladies Bay, Saint Heliers
- Little Palm Beach, Waiheke Island
- O'Neills Beach
- Orpheus Bay
- St Leonards Beach, Takapuna
- Pohutukawa Bay (Long Bay), North Shore

===== Coromandel Peninsula =====
- Opoutere Beach

===== Bay of Plenty =====
- Waihi Beach
- Papamoa Beach, Tauranga (Note: Pāpāmoa Beach, Tauranga 37°41′14″S 176°16′00″E)

===== Taranaki =====
- Tapuae Beach, New Plymouth

===== Manawatū-Whanganui =====
- Ototoka Beach, Whanganui

===== Hawke's Bay Region =====
- Ocean Beach

===== Wellington =====
- Breaker Bay (Note: Breaker Bay, Wellington 41°19′48″S 174°49′56″E)
- Peka Peka Beach, Kāpiti Coast (Note: Peka Peka Beach, Kāpiti Coast 40°49′58″S 175°03′12″E)

==== South Island ====
===== Nelson =====
- Moturoa / Rabbit Island, Richmond

===== Westland District =====
- Barrytown Beach
- Carters Beach
- Lake Kaniere

===== Canterbury Region =====
- Ashworths Beach
- Waikuku Beach
- Woodend Beach, Woodend

===== Christchurch and Banks Peninsula =====
- Camp Bay
- Hikuraki Bay
- Spencer Park Beach
- Taylors Mistake Beach (Note: Taylors Mistake Beach, Christchurch 43°34′54″S 172°46′36″E)
- Tumbledown Bay

===== Otago Region =====
- Homestead Bay, Lake Wānaka
- Willsher Bay, Kaka Point

===== Dunedin =====
- Allans Beach (Note: Allans Beach, Dunedin 45°52′41″S 170°41′28″E)
- Boulder Beach (Note: Boulder Beach, Dunedin 45°53′49″S 170°36′45″E)
- Doctors Point Beach (Note: Doctors Point Beach, Dunedin 45°43′58″S 170°36′12″E)
- Kaikai Beach (Note: Kaikai Beach, Dunedin 45°45′43″S 170°41′2″E)
- Mapoutahi Cove (Note: Mapoutahi Cove, Dunedin 45°44′08″S 170°36′56″E)
- Ryans Beach (Note: Ryans Beach, Dunedin 45°48′42″S 170°44′35″E)
- Sandfly Bay (Note: Sandfly Bay, Dunedin 45°53′46″S 170°38′30″E)
- Smaills Beach (Note: Smaills Beach, Dunedin 45°54′26″S 170°33′40″E)
- Victory Beach (Note: Victory Beach, Dunedin 45°49′39″S 170°43′56″E)
- Warrington Beach (Note: Warrington Beach, Dunedin 45°43′11″S 170°36′04″E)
- Whareakeake (Murdering Beach) (Note: Whareakeake (Murdering Beach), Dunedin 45°45′43″S 170°40′05″E)

===== Southland Region =====
- Whakaputa Beach

===== Invercargill =====
- North Beach

=== Clubs ===
- Auckland Counties Sun Club, Auckland
- Auckland Naturist Orewa, Auckland
- Auckland Outdoor Naturist Club, Auckland
- Autumn Farm, Golden Bay
- Bay of Plenty Sun Club, Whakatāne
- Guysers Gaystay B&B (for men), Rotorua
- Hauraki Naturally, Hauraki Plains, (Website)
- Hawkes Bay Outdoor Leisure Club, Napier
- Katikati Naturist Park, Bay of Plenty
- Manawatu Naturist Club, Oroua Downs, Manawatū District
- Nelson Sun Club, Nelson
- Orchard Sun Club, Sutton, Dunedin
- Pineglades Naturist Club, Rolleston (Note: Pineglades Naturist Club 43°36′15″S 172°22′20″E)
- Rotota Sun Club, Rotorua
- South Canterbury Sun Club, Geraldine
- Southern Naturally, Invercargill
- Wai-natur Naturist Park, Blenheim
- Wellington Naturist Club, Te Mārua, Upper Hutt (Note: Wellington Naturist Club 41°05′34″S 175°08′03″E)
- Woodside Park/Waikato Outdoor Society, Hamilton

== United States ==
=== Hawaii ===
Nude beaches can be found on Hawaii's four largest islands. Some are officially designated as nude beaches, while others officially forbid nudity but tolerate it in practice.

==== Oahu ====
- Sand Island is an island within Honolulu on the island of Oahu. On the small island, accessible by causeway, at the southwestern most point, is a small secluded beach that is often frequented by nudists. Nudity is illegal at Sand Island due to a state park rule against nudity.
- Polo Beach in Makaleha City and County Park on the North Shore of Oahu has a clothing optional area. Look for a white rail fence on Farrington Highway right or ocean side about four miles west of Haleiwa, north shore. Park there. When entering the beach area from the dirt access trail from highway where park rules sign is walk RIGHT (NOT left) on the beach for clothing optional. Signage prohibiting nudity was removed in 2016.

==== Hawai‘i (Big Island) ====
- Kehena (“Dolphin Beach”) is a black sand beach in the Puna District of the island of Hawai‘i.
- Hangin’ Loose Clothing-Optional Retreat & Botanical Gardens is a thirty-minute drive from Kehena in the Puna District of the Island of Hawai‘i, the “Big Island.”

==== Maui ====
- Little Mākena Beach. A sign forbidding nudity was erected in 2021 as the beach is in a state park where nudity is illegal. Nevertheless, nudism remains common here. Located in Mākena State Park, Maui.
- Red Sand Beach near Hāna
- Slaughterhouse Beach in Hana Highway on Maui
- Pāʻia Secret Beach near Paia

==== Kaua‘i ====
- Kauapea Beach on Kaua‘i. The English name is Secret Beach. Walk along the sand east, towards the light house on the cliff, until you reach Third and Fourth Beaches. There are "showers", outpourings of water from the rock wall between Second and Third Beaches where you can shower.
- Larsen's Beach on Kaua‘i. This is the primary clothing-optional Beach on Kauai. The Hawaiian name is Lepeuli.
