= James Gordon Partridge Bisset =

British merchant navy captain

Sir James Bisset CBE RD RNR
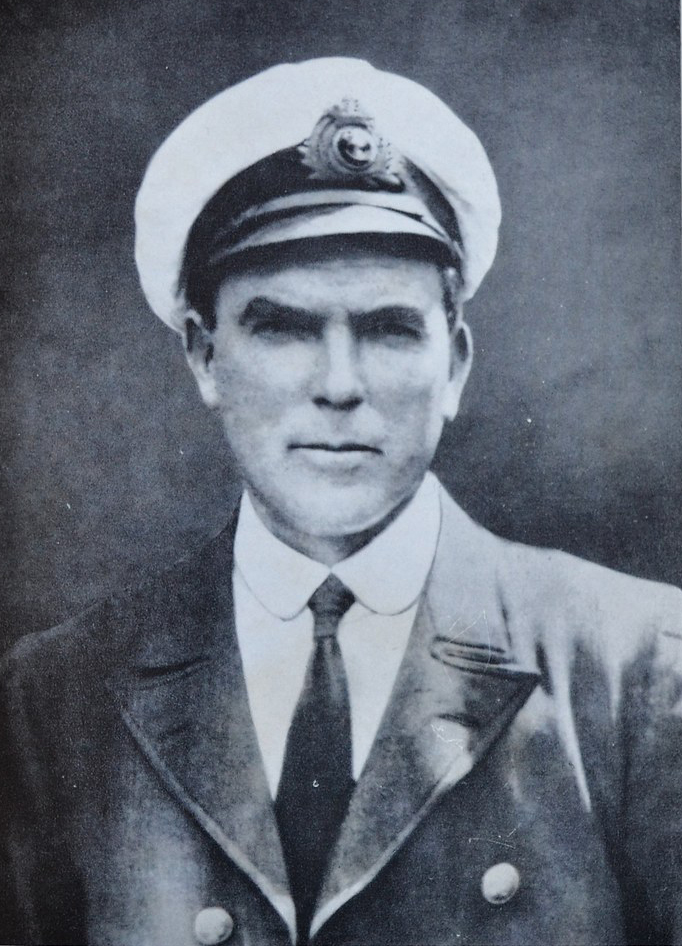
- Bisset in 1906
- Born: 15 July 1883; Liverpool, Lancashire, England
- Died: 28 March 1967 (aged 83); Bournemouth, Dorset, England
- Occupations: Merchant seaman, Naval officer
- Known for: Cunard White Star Line
- Spouse: May Hodgson (m. 1913)
- Children: 1
- Military career
- Allegiance: United Kingdom
- Branch: Royal Naval Reserve
- Rank: Captain
- Conflicts: World War I; World War II
- Awards: Order of the British Empire (military division); Reserve Decoration

Sir James Gordon Partridge Bisset CBE RD RNR (15 July 1883 – 28 March 1967) was a British merchant sea captain who served as Commodore of the Cunard White Star Line (1944–47), commanding Cunard liners RMS Queen Mary and RMS Queen Elizabeth during World War II. He was notably also second officer aboard RMS Carpathia the night it went to rescue the survivors of the sinking of RMS Titanic.

Bisset documented his fifty-year sea career in a three-volume autobiography: Sail Ho! My Early Years at Sea (1958); Tramps and Ladies – My Early Years in Steamers (1959) and Commodore – War, Peace and Big Ships (1961). In addition, he authored Lifeboat Efficiency (1924) which became the primary text used by the British Merchant Navy until the World War II for instructing merchant seaman in lifeboat utilization and handling, and Ship Ahoy! Nautical Notes for Ocean Travellers (1930), a treatise on shipboard operations for the edification of passengers.

== Early life ==
James Bisset was born in Liverpool, UK, on 15 July 1883, the son of Scottish father, James Smith Bisset of Blairgowrie, Perthshire, UK and an English mother, Sarah Ellen Butler of Bolton, Lancashire, UK. The second of six children, James attended St Saviour's Infant School in Liverpool and later the Granby Street Board School. In 1897 at fourteen years of age, he was apprenticed as an office clerk in the Liverpool branch of the London and Provincial Marine Insurance Company. After listening to the sea stories of one of his "uncles" (a close friend of the Bisset family), James decided to stow away on a windjammer in 1897 but was discovered and returned home. Late in 1897, he was apprenticed as a junior clerk in the Liverpool office of the Anglo-American Oil company.

== Career ==
=== Career in sail ===
Unsatisfied by office work, in the summer of 1898 Bisset became indentured as an ordinary seaman through William Thomas & Co., Ltd. of Liverpool for a four-year apprenticeship. He soon set sail from Liverpool on the barque County of Pembroke for a ten-month voyage. Bisset gained additional practical experience in navigation and seamanship during a subsequent voyage of two years and seven weeks aboard the County of Pembroke. In late 1902, a third voyage aboard the County of Pembroke, completed Bisset's four-year apprenticeship and he earned a posting as able bodied seaman and eventually third mate.

In early spring of 1903, Bisset enrolled in the Navigation School of the Mercantile Marine Service Association in Liverpool to prepare for the second mate's examination which he passed in May. He returned to the employ of William Thomas & Co., Ltd. of Liverpool embarking as Second Mate in the barque County of Cardigan on 26 May 1903. After an eighteen-month voyage, Bisset returned to Liverpool, having achieved the required time in service as a Second Mate to be able to sit for the First Mate's exam which he passed in February 1905. He then embarked on a series of voyages in steamships over the next two years to gain practical experience towards sitting for the master's examination which he passed (Master in Sail) in March 1905. Encouraged by his mother, he continued his studies in the navigation school toward the extra master's certificate which he passed on 15 May 1907.

=== Career in steam ===
On 17 May 1907, the same day he passed for his extra master's certificate, Bisset made inquiries at the Cunard Steamship Company's office at Huskisson Dock on the Mersey which landed him a posting as fourth officer aboard the Cunard liner Caronia. In July 1907, Bisset was transferred to the older Cunard liner Ultonia, also in the position of fourth officer. In March 1908, he was again transferred to Cunard's Umbria where he served as junior third officer. By November 1908, another transfer had occurred to Cunard's Ivernia, this time as third officer. From January 1909 to May 1911, Bisset served as third officer on a Cunard cargo vessel Brescia under Captains Arthur Rostron, George Melsom, and Charles Morrison between Liverpool and the Mediterranean. He continued in Cunard's Mediterranean service aboard the Phrygia through November 1911. On 1 January 1910, Bisset was confirmed in the rank of sub-lieutenant in the Royal Naval Reserve (RNR).

=== Titanic rescue ===
After a short period of naval training in the spring of 1912, Bisset was posted as second officer to Cunard's RMS Carpathia, again serving under Captain Arthur Rostron. In this position, Bisset would be on duty in the North Atlantic on the evening of 14 April 1912 when Carpathia responded to wireless distress calls from the White Star Liner RMS Titanic. Carpathia led rescue operations until 8:30 am on the morning of 15 April when she set sail for New York with 712 Titanic survivors aboard. Bisset details the Carpathia's rescue efforts and records his reminiscences of that night in the second book of his autobiographical trilogy, "Tramps and Ladies – My Early Years in Steamers" (1959).

=== Teens and 1920s ===
After his payoff from Carpathia and following additional naval training, Bisset rejoined Cunard's liner Caronia as first officer. He was promoted to lieutenant in the RNR on 16 May 1914, and would serve aboard Caronia during World War I. He was subsequently transferred to Cunard's famous Mauretania as first officer. Following the War, Bisset was appointed chief officer on Cunard's Carmania for two voyages, and subsequently returned to the Cunard cargo service in August 1919 as first officer of the Verbania, a small Cunard tramp steamer. The following May, he was appointed back to the Mauretania as senior first officer, a post he held through July 1921. In November 1921, Bisset joined Cunard's Canadian service as first officer aboard the new liner Albania.

Bisset was promoted to lieutenant-commander RNR on 16 May 1922. From October 1922 to July 1923 he served as chief officer aboard a charter to Germany of Cunard's Saxonia, and then served briefly on the transatlantic service as chief officer in Cunard's Caronia and Scythia before being recalled for additional naval training. From May 1924 to May 1925 he returned to the Caronia as chief officer on both the Liverpool/Montreal and Liverpool/New York runs. In June 1925 he was named chief officer on the new Cunard Liner Franconia, serving through the following June, and then again from mid-July 1926 to June 1927. He joined the Cunard liner Berengaria as chief officer for the next four years, serving through May 1931.

=== 1930s ===
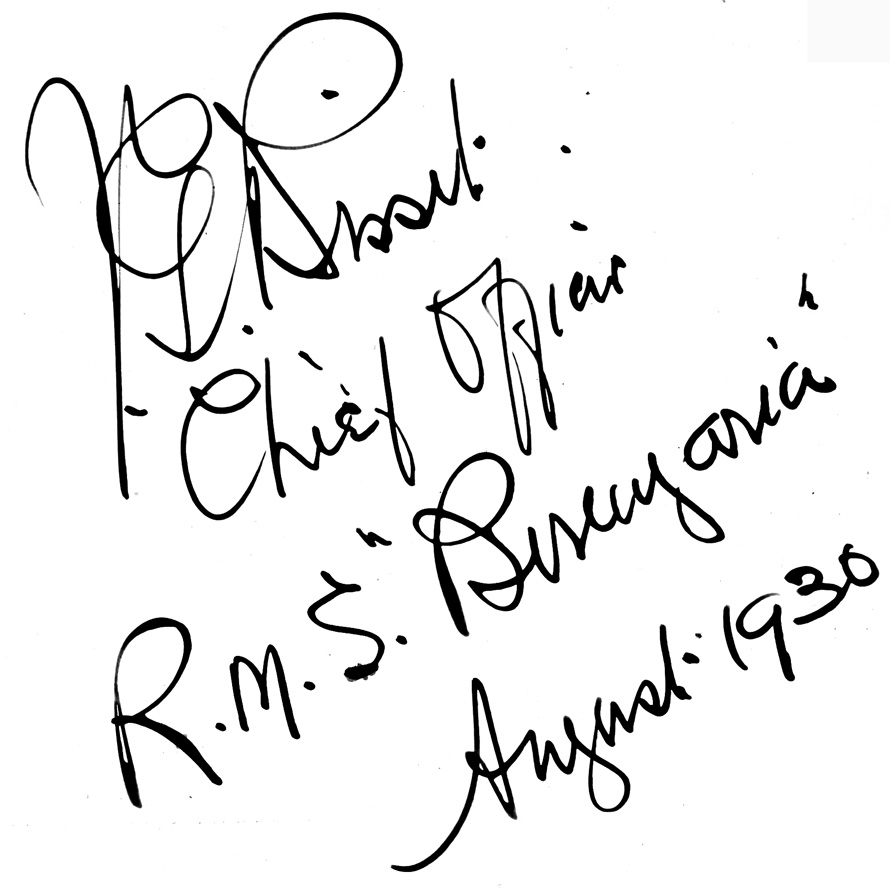
Bisset's signature while he was chief officer of the Berengaria

In mid-May 1931, the Cunard Board of Directors conferred upon Bisset the rank of captain in the company's fleet. Through the end of 1932, Bisset rotated through several positions including captain of the Aurania (May–June 1931), staff captain of the Berengaria (June 1931 – December 1932). In December 1932 he was given command of the Ascania, in the Cunard Canadian service, in which he served through December 1936. He retired from the RNR on 15 July 1933 with the rank of captain. In January 1937 he took command of Cunard's Lancastria and in November that same year was transferred to the command of the Scythia through January 1939, when he assumed command of the Laconia.

=== WWII and later command years ===
In June 1939, command of the liner Franconia was turned over to Bisset. He remained with her from the outbreak of hostilities in September 1939 into early 1942 when he was appointed to the command of the Queen Mary on 23 February. Through the end of World War II, Bisset would captain both Queen Mary and Queen Elizabeth on a total of sixty-six wartime voyages. Including his war service in the Franconia, Bisset steamed 424,563 nautical miles and delivered 447,777 troops to various theaters of conflict from 1939 to 1946. On 28 August 1944, Bisset was named commodore of the Cunard Line by the company's board of directors. In July 1946, Bisset turned 63 thereby attaining the age for compulsory retirement from the Cunard service. On 16 October 1946, he captained the Queen Elizabeth on her maiden voyage in commercial service to New York. On 10 January 1947, Bisset formally handed over command of the Queen Elizabeth and retired from the Cunard Line.

== Retirement ==
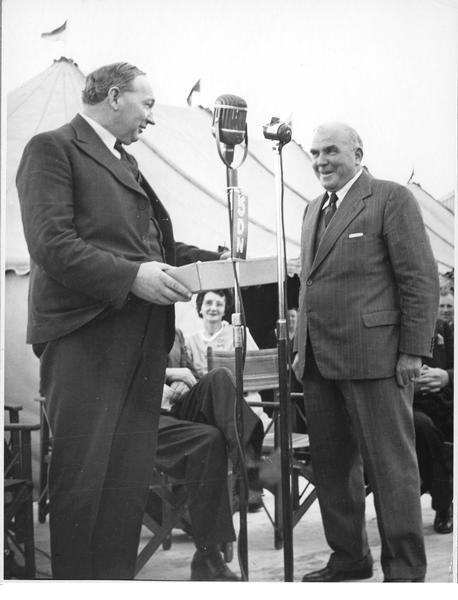
Bisset, right, presents a barometer to Thomas Playford at the opening of the Birkenhead Terminal, Port Adelaide, 29 September 1950

Bisset and his wife retired in 1948 to overlook Little Manly, Sydney Harbour, Australia, where he was well received by the local community and by his own recollection through personal journals gave more than 1,800 talks about his sea career and war service to more than 200,000 Australians.

== Personal life ==
Bisset was married to May Hodgson in London on 28 June 1913. They had one son, James Gordon Barry, who died following childbirth from the effects of German Measles.

Bisset died on 28 March 1967, aged 83 years. His body was cremated and his ashes were scattered in the Solent.

== Honors and awards ==
=== Military decorations ===
- Reserve Decoration
- Commander of the Order of the British Empire (CBE), 1942 Birthday Honours
- Knight Bachelor, 10 July 1945
- Mercantile Marine War Medal
- British War Medal, WWI
- Victory Medal
- 1914–15 Star
- 1939–1945 Star
- Pacific Star
- Atlantic Star
- War Medal 1939–1945
- Commander of the Legion of Merit (U.S.A.)

=== Others ===
- Honorary Doctor of Laws, University of Cambridge, 1946

== 21st century recognition by Cunard ==
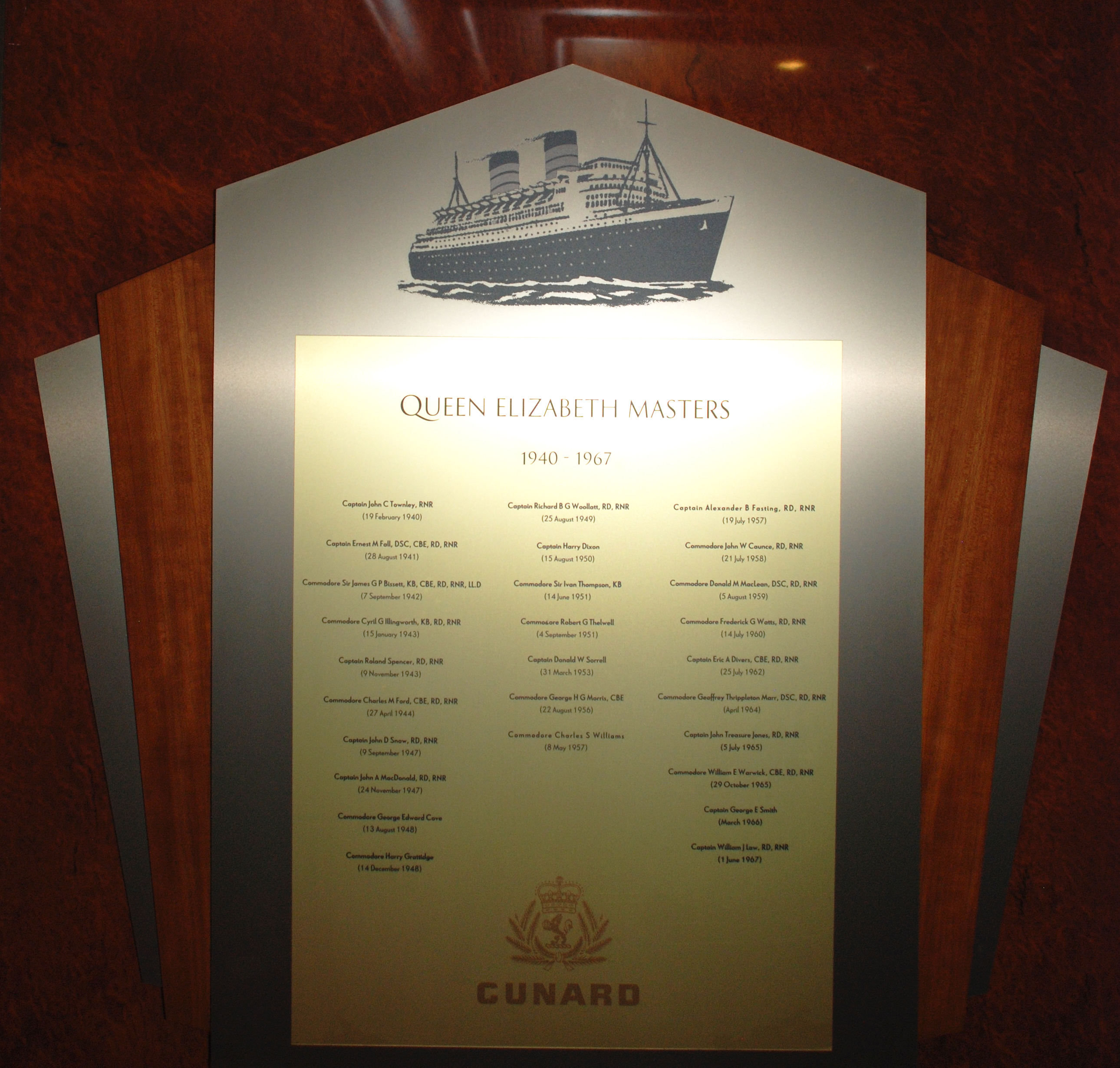
QE masters plaque – aboard Cunard Line's MV Queen Elizabeth (2010)

Bisset was later recognised with a suite named in his honor aboard Cunard Line's new MS Queen Elizabeth which entered service in October 2010. Six Cunard Commodores were also given recognition aboard the vessel with named suites including Commodore Arthur Rostron under whom Bisset served in several Cunarders, most notably the RMS Carpathia which sailed to the rescue of passengers of the White Star Line steamer Titanic on 15 April 1912.

Aboard MS Queen Elizabeth, the Bisset suite (stateroom 7177) is located on the starboard side of Deck 7. The Rostron Suite is located at the opposite end of the same corridor, on the port side of Deck 7 (stateroom 7150). There is onboard MS Queen Elizabeth Bisset is listed on a plaque dedicated to the masters of the RMS Queen Elizabeth of 1940, namesake of the current vessel. The plaque is located outside of the port side entrance to the Commodore Club, Deck 10 forward.

== Bibliography ==
- Lifeboat Efficiency (1924)
- Ship Ahoy ! : Nautical Notes for Ocean Travellers (1930)
- Sail Ho! My Early Years in Sail (1958)
- Tramps and Ladies – My Early Years in Steam (1959)
- Commodore – War, Peace and Big Ships (1961)
