= Little Manly =

Little Manly is the name of two places:

- Little Manly Cove, a suburb of Sydney, Australia
- Little Manly, New Zealand is a suburb on the Whangaparaoa Peninsula north of Auckland, New Zealand
