= East Ballina =

- Suburb
- Coordinates: 28°51′34″S 153°35′00″E
- Country: Australia
- State: New South Wales
- Region: NSW North Coast
- LGA: Ballina Shire

Population
  - Total: 5,571 (2016 census)
- Postcode: 2478

East Ballina, New South Wales is a suburb of the town of Ballina, New South Wales and has three main beaches: Angels Beach, Shelly Beach and Lighthouse Beach. It is also the location of Shaws Bay, which was named for one of the early settles James Shaw.

It is also the location of the historic Richmond River Light which was built in 1879. Another popular attraction is the Shaws Bay Hotel, which is located alongside a now historic house, constructed in 1881, and known first as 'Fenwick House' after Captain Thomas Fenwick.

It is on the lands of the Bundjalung people, who are the traditional owners of this area.

== History ==
East Ballina was the original settlement of Ballina and it is where the timber cutters, the first Europeans to settle in this area, initially camped. They originally called the area Deptford and the area around Shaws Bay was called New Chum Tom.

East Ballina is the site of the East Ballina Massacre, sometimes called the Black Head massacre, in 1853-1854 which was one of the Richmond River massacres.
