= Lighthouse Beach, New South Wales =

Beach in Australia

Lighthouse Beach
- Beach
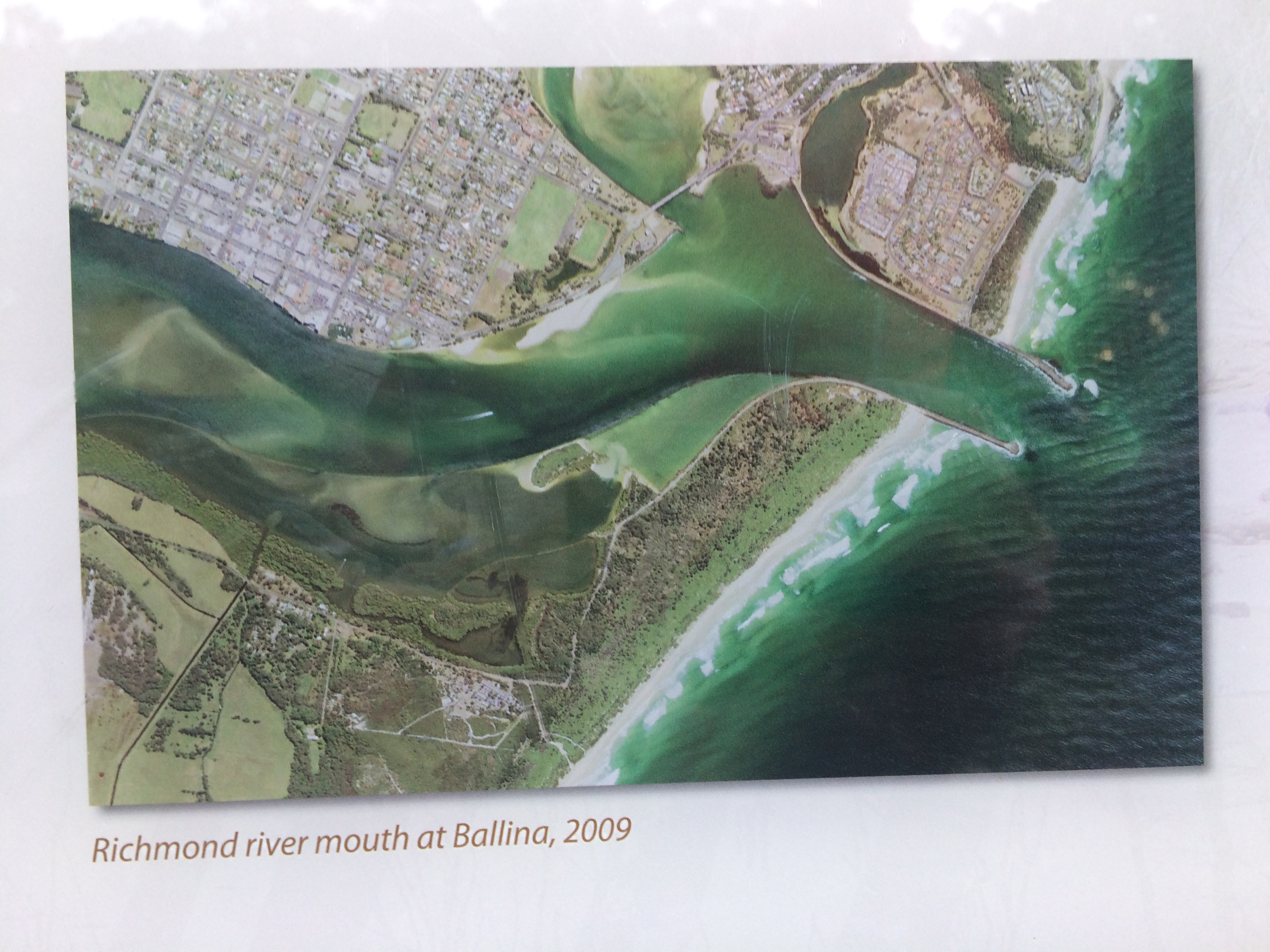
- Lighthouse Beach seen to the north of the Richmond River northern wall
- Interactive map of Lighthouse Beach
- Coordinates: 28.8707°S 153.5909°E
- Location: Ballina, New South Wales, Australia
- Formed by: Sand deposit

Dimensions
  - Length: 650 m (2,130 ft)

Lighthouse Beach is a surf lifesaving patrolled beach in East Ballina, NSW, Australia. Located in between Shelley Beach and The North Wall, Ballina, this beach is approximately 600m long and 50m wide. It is most notable for its shark attacks.

== History ==
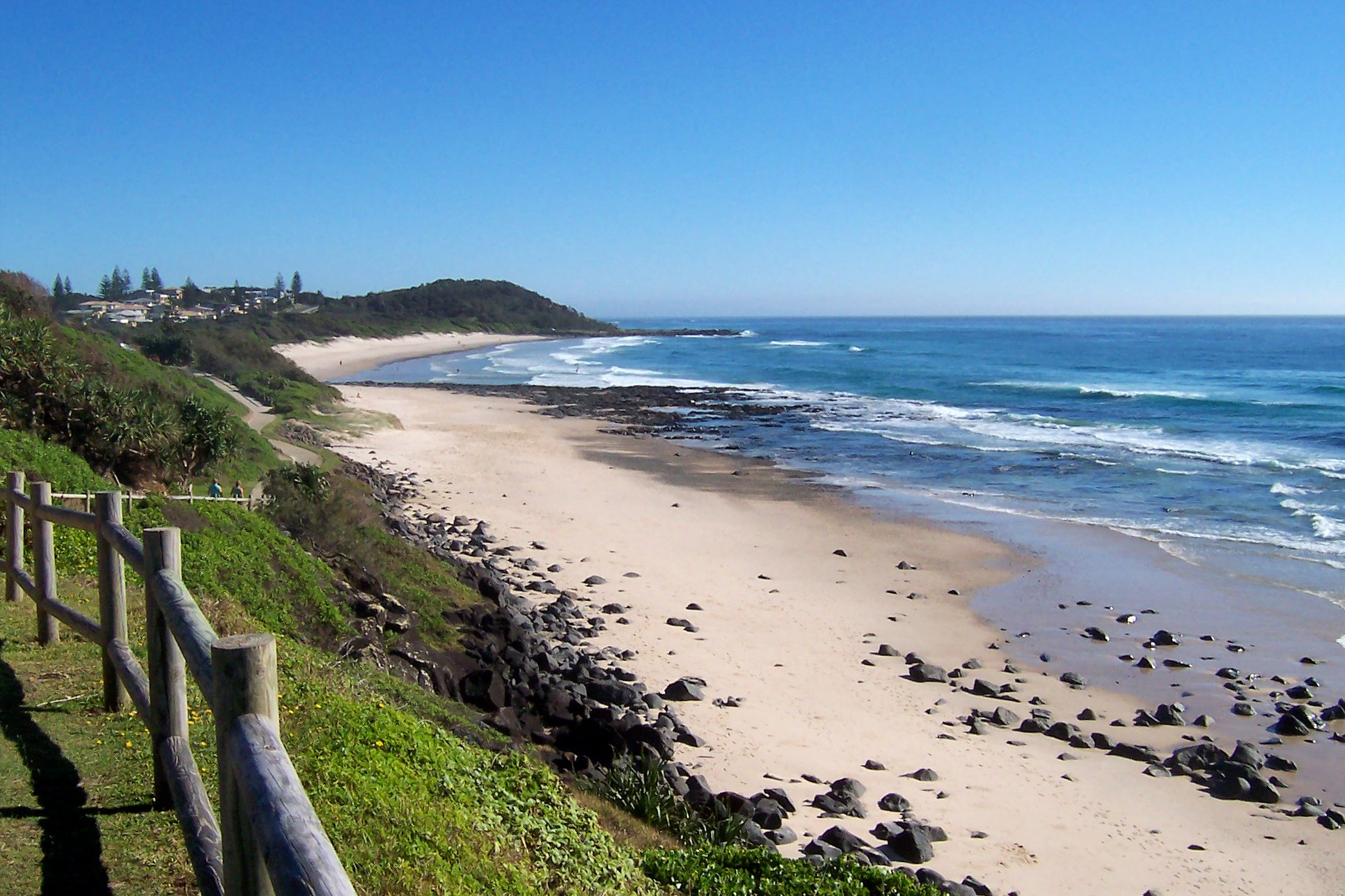
Shelly Beach, situated next to Lighthouse Beach

The beach was created in the 1890s when sand pushed up against the newly constructed training walls of the Richmond River, causing Shaws Bay to fill with sand and forming the beach between the northern training wall and Ballina Head. It was given the name of "Tomki Beach" after a 1907 shipwreck. The beach was popular as a place to walk but also became popular as a swimming destination in the 1920s as culture changed. In the 1970s 30 hectares (0.12 sq mi) of beachfront land was developed into housing.

== Dangers ==
The beach is a popular surfing location but has a history of shark attacks, including fatal ones in 2008 and 2015. A shark barrier was installed in 2016 in order to attempt to prevent attacks, but problems with the barriers surfaced within months of their installation. It was discontinued when its impact on sand movement and swells was identified. Another shark attack occurred several weeks later, on 26 September, with lifeguards chasing the shark away using jet-skis when it attacked a surfer. Lighthouse Beach was one of five to have drum lines installed later in the year to capture sharks. The beach is regarded as dangerous to swimmers because of rip tides, of which it has two, and strong currents.
