= Little Manly Beach =

Beach in Australia

Coordinates: 33.8066°S 151.2868°E

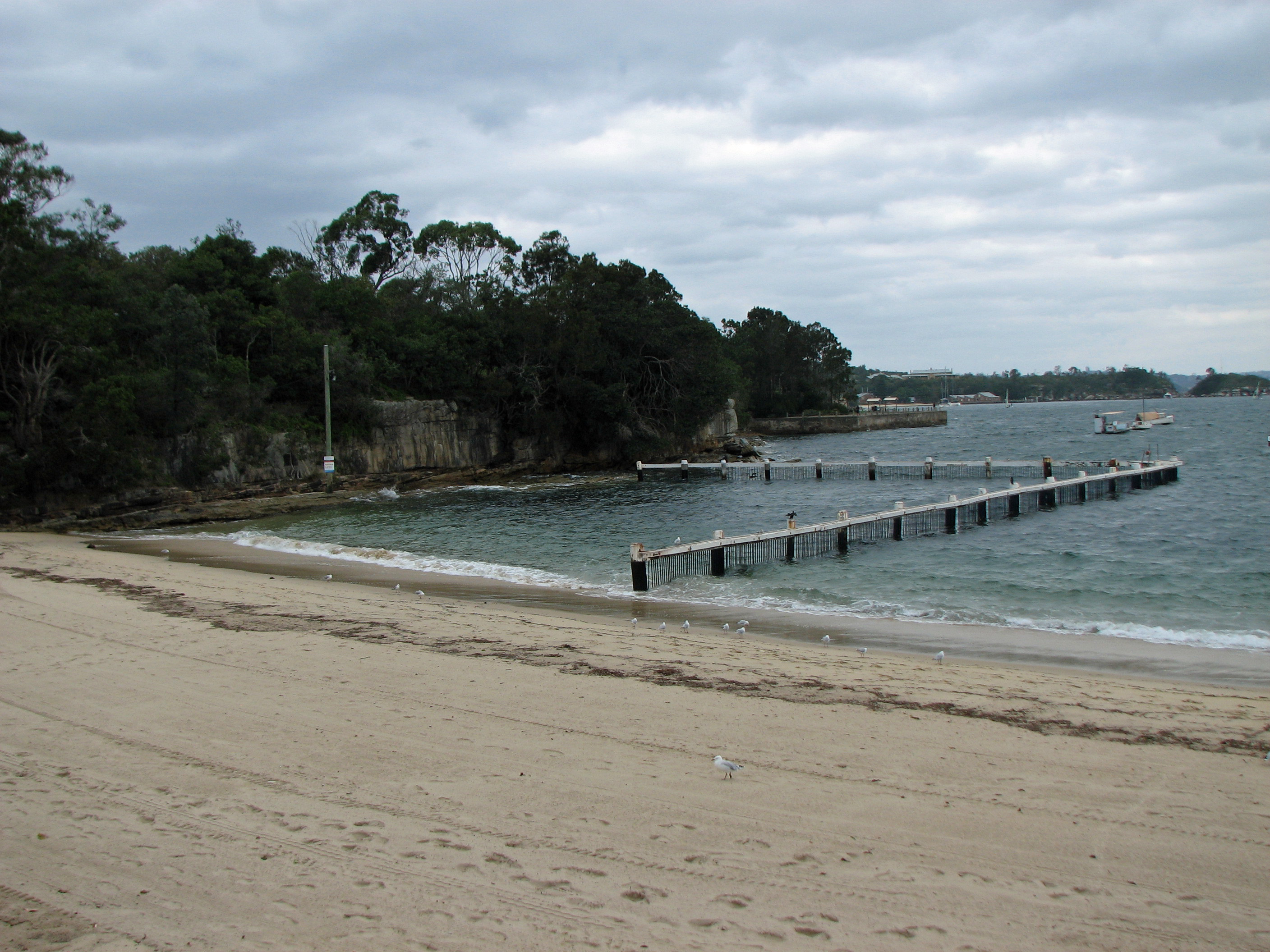
Little Manly Beach in Little Manly Cove, facing east

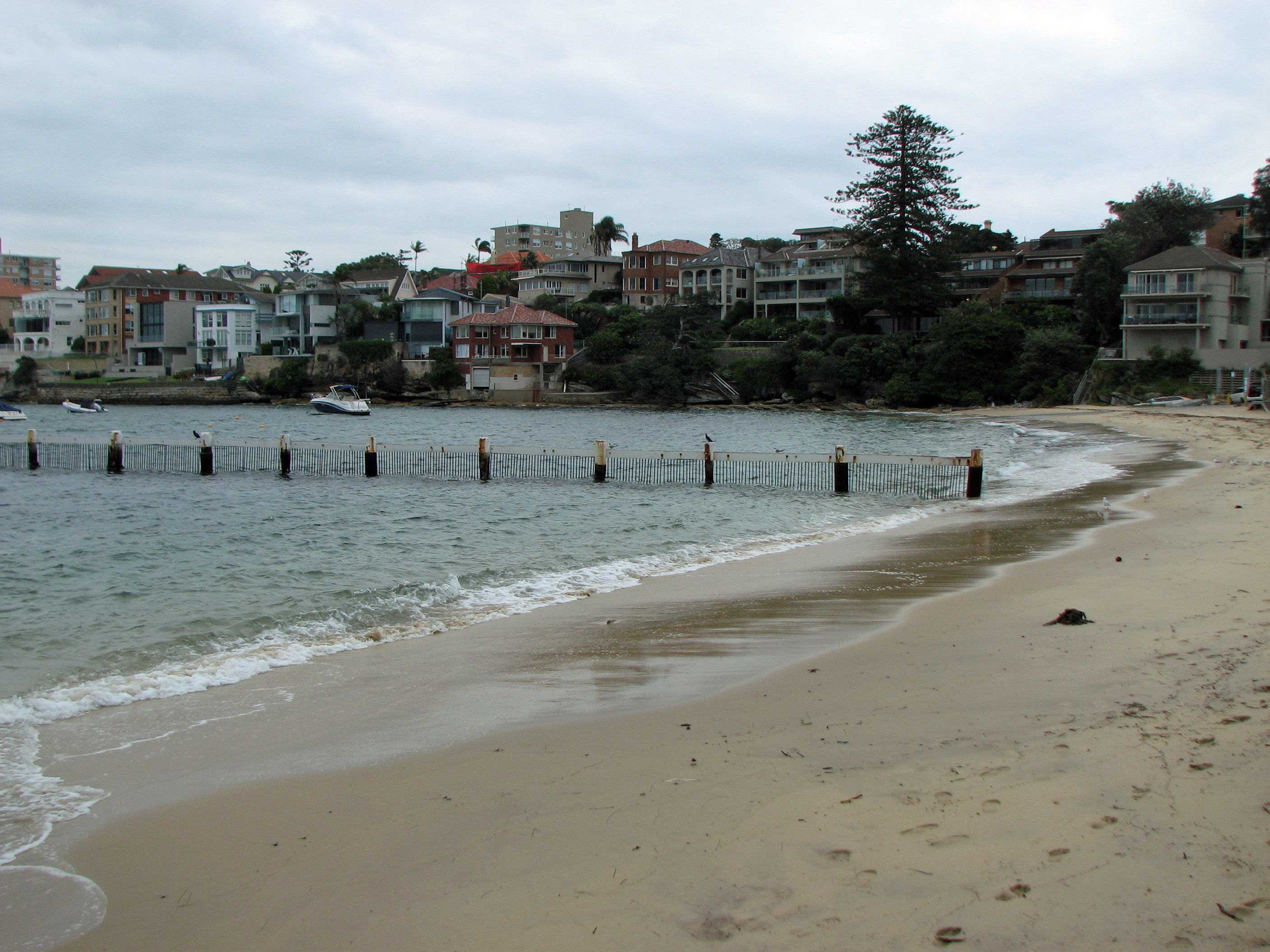
Little Manly Beach in Little Manly Cove, facing east

Little Manly Beach is situated on the northern shore of Sydney Harbour, within Little Manly Cove, which is separated from the larger Manly Cove by Manly Point.

== History ==
In 1809 surveyor James Meehan drew up two plots of land in the Manly area, one for Richard Chears and one for Gilbert Baker. Richard Chears' land encompassed what we know today as Little Manly. On Meehan’s field book drawing, ‘Little Manly’ is clearly written.

In 1879 tenders were called for the construction of two new baths in the Manly Municipality, one for women in Manly Cove and one for men at the western end of Little Manly Cove. The baths were opened in May 1880. Over the years a constant process of renewal of the baths structure has taken place due to storm damage and natural depreciation, though there has continuously been an enclosure since the original construction.

There is a concrete boat ramp on the eastern end of the beach, one of the few concrete ramps on the northern shore of Port Jackson. Behind the beach are public toilets and a kiosk. The beach is a popular place for families because of the presence of the baths and a grassed picnic area, as well as a children's playground.
