= Sunnyside North Beach =

Clothes-optional beach in the State of Victoria, Australia

Coordinates: 38°11′48″S 145°03′57″E

Sunnyside North Beach is a clothes-optional beach located south of Mount Eliza, Port Philip Bay and approximately 12 kilometres from Frankston in the State of Victoria, Australia. It is designated as a legal nudist beach under the Nudity (Prescribed Areas) Act 1983. It is the only clothes-optional beach on the east side of Port Philip Bay.

== About the beach ==
Signs at each end of the beach indicate the legal nude area. As the beach is on Port Philip Bay tides are not very high.

The beach is not patrolled by lifesavers.

== How to get there ==
The beach is south of Moondah Beach and north of Bidwell Beach. The beach immediately next to the car park at the end of Sunnyside Road is not the legal nude beach.

Access to the legal nude section is from the right side of the car park which is approximately 500 meters from the start of the nude beach. The walk north can be taken via a winding dirt path through scrub or via the beach which has a rocky section to navigate. Regulars to the beach maintain a path by clearing rocks and using concrete.

Alternatively, there is a longer scenic walk southward from the car park at the end of Kunyung Road along Moondah Beach.

== Facilities ==
There are toilets and showers located next to the car park and free electric barbeques at the far end of the carpark.

== Gallery ==
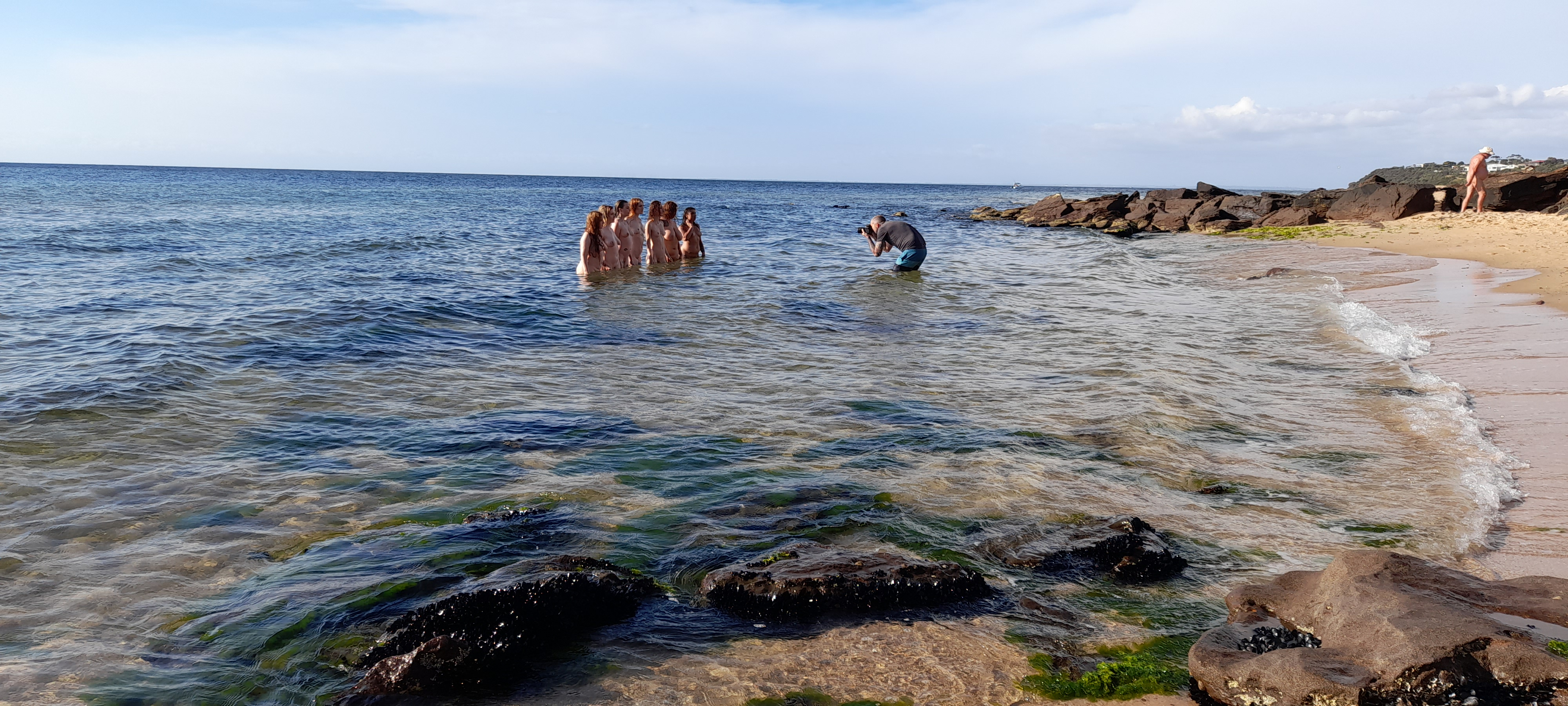
Evening at the beach

== See also ==
- Point Impossible Beach, a clothing-optional beach located near Torquay
- Southside Beach, another clothing-optional beach located near Torquay
