= Southside Beach =

Clothes-optional beach in Victoria, Australia

Coordinates: 38°22′29.453″S 144°16′17.429″E

Southside Beach is a clothes-optional beach located near Torquay, in Victoria, Australia. It is designated as a legal nudist beach under the Nudity (Prescribed Areas) Act 1983.

== About the beach ==
It is a surf beach west of Torquay. It is about 30 minutes drive from Geelong.

Signs at both ends of the beach are regularly vandalised or stolen, and the exact legal area can be hard to identify. The beach is very flat and tides come in a very long way. Only a narrow strip of sand remains at high tide and caution is advised when selecting a spot to set up.

There are no lifesavers patrolling this beach at any time therefore caution must be taken when in the water.

== How to get there ==
The beach is south west of Bells Beach and north east of Point Addis Beach. It replaced the previously legal beach just west of Point Addis when that beach's status was revoked. Most nudists remain at the 'revoked' area.

Access is via either a long and steep walk from the westernmost carpark at Bells Beach, or via a staircase from Point Addis Rd. Pt Addis Rd runs south from a 90 degree bend in the Great Ocean Road south of Jarosite Rd. Jarosite Road/Bells Beach Road provides access to the Bells Beach carparks.

== Parking ==
There is a sealed carpark atop a high cliff at the western end of Bells Beach. There is a small carpark as well as limited parking along Pt Addis Rd. Parking restrictions apply and enforcement is enthusiastic.

At the Bells Beach end, a steep walking track leads from the car park to the beach at the base of the cliff. From there, it is a long walk to the west and around a rocky point, where the waves lap the cliff face at high tide. The water is very shallow and is safe to walk in.

At the Pt Addis end, there is a wooden staircase near the carpark which leads to the textile (non-nudist) part of the beach. The legal nude beach is a short walk to the left, and is roughly in the middle of the beach.

== Facilities ==
There are toilets at Bells Beach, 300 metres from the Southside car park and approx 200 m from the access steps on Pt Addis Rd.

== See also ==
- Point Impossible Beach, another clothing-optional beach located near Torquay
- Sunnyside North Beach, a clothing-optional beach near Mount Eliza
