= Point Impossible Beach =

Nudist beach in Torquay, Victoria, Australia

Coordinates: 38°18′47″S 144°21′54″E

Point Impossible Beach is a clothes-optional beach located at Torquay, west coast, in the State of Victoria, Australia. It is designated as a legal nudist beach under the Nudity (Prescribed Areas) Act 1983.

== About the beach ==
It is a surf beach on the eastern outskirts of Torquay. It is about 30 minutes drive from Geelong. A broad uninterrupted white sand beach stretches in both directions from the carpark, and is bordered by large dunes covered by grasses and shrubs.

== How to get there ==
Heading south from Melbourne or Geelong along the Surfcoast Highway, turn left before Torquay onto Blackgate Rd or South Beach Rd, then right at Horseshoe Bend Rd. Turn left at the end onto The Esplanade. There is a carpark at the end of the gravel section of The Esplanade, with access to the middle of the legal nude beach.

== Parking ==
A gravelled car park is located behind the beach.

The car park and surrounding dunes have been fenced to protect the vegetation which is stabilising the dune system.

== Facilities ==
There are toilets available but no shower facilities.

== See also ==
- Southside Beach, another clothing-optional beach located near Torquay
- Sunnyside North Beach, a clothing-optional beach near Mount Eliza
