= Manly Life Saving Club =

Manly
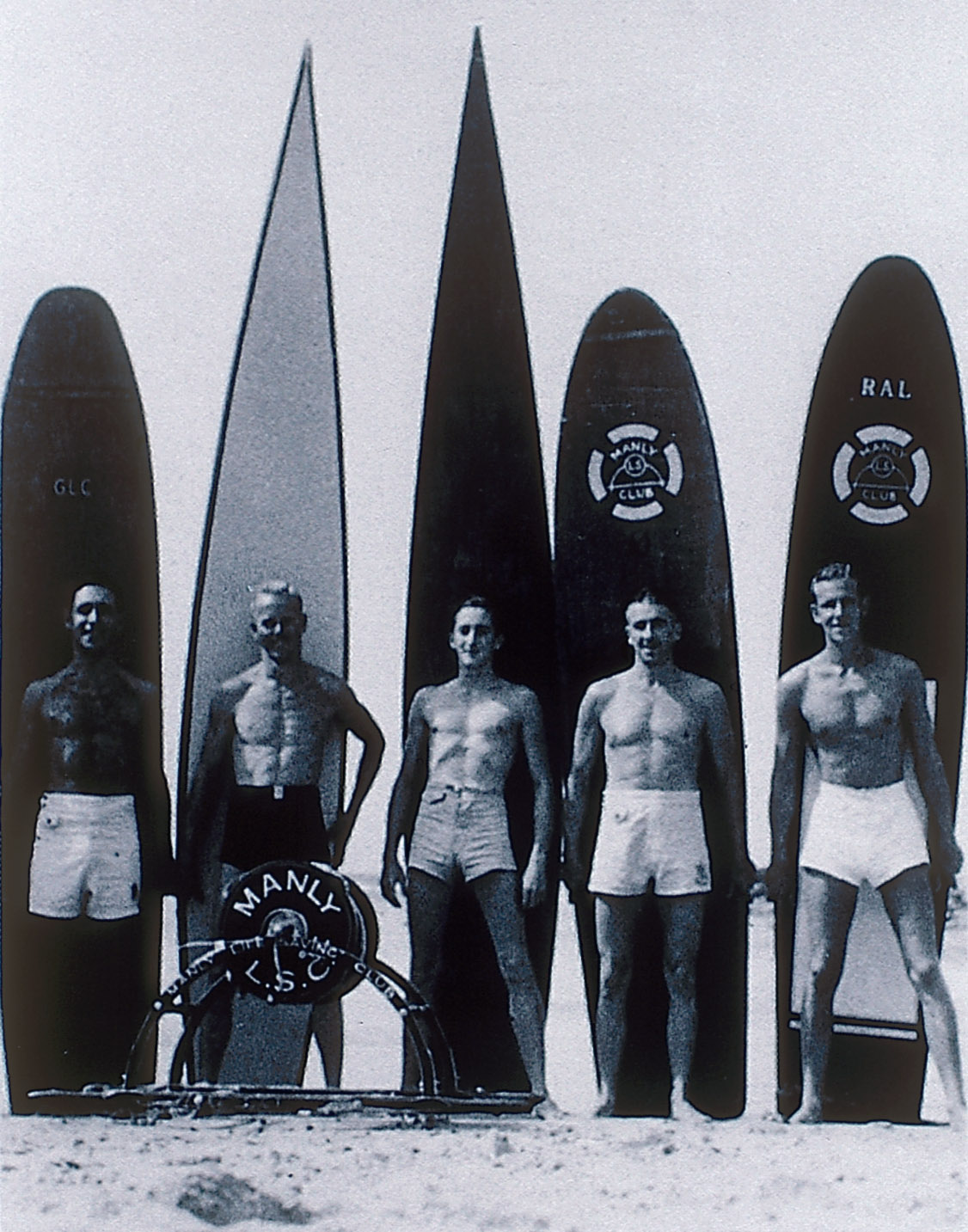
- The surf reel in the foreground features the Manly Life Saving Club logo.
- Full name: Manly Life Saving Club
- Founded: 1911
- Members: 500 senior, 250 junior

The Manly Life Saving Club is one of Australia's oldest surf life saving clubs (SLSC), being founded in 1911. Manly, Bondi Surf Bathers' Life Saving Club and Bronte Surf Lifesaving Club all have competing claims to be the first in Australia (and the world). The primary role of the club is to provide surf rescue, first aid and promote water safety on Manly Beach. Since 1911, no lives have been lost on the beach while the club has been on patrol. It is located in the Sydney suburb of Manly, in the Northern Beaches Council in New South Wales.

== History ==
The club was founded in 1911 to patrol Manly Beach after a law banning daylight swimming was overturned. The founding president was James Bonner, then mayor of Manly. The current club president is actor Tony Bonner, grandson of James Bonner.

In 1912, Captain Arthur Holmes, known as "Skipper", was appointed president, a position which he held for 26 years. During his long term, he built up the club into one of the finest surfing organisations in the state. As a carnival organiser, his principal achievement was the great surfing gala at South Steyne on the occasion of the visit of the Duke of Gloucester. He was the organiser and manager of the first surf-life-saving team to visit Western Australia. His services were rewarded by being appointed one of the first life members of the SLSA. He was similarly honoured by the old club. For many years, he was also one of the stalwarts of the Manly Amateur Swimming Club.

A high proportion of the surf life saving members had been soldiers. Skipper served in the Boer War and the First World War. He was the younger brother of Major General William Holmes, the most senior Australian officer to die in battle in the First World War. He was for years the secretary of the Voluntary Workers' Association, formed in 1916, to provide homes for disabled soldiers and sailors and their dependents. Arthur Holmes was born in Victoria Barracks, in 1867, one of 12 children, and died in 1943.

Location on South Steyne, the club operated the Manly Surf Life Saving Pavilion, which was designed by Winsome Hall Andrew and completed in 1939, when it was awarded the 1939 Sulman Award for Architecture. The pavilion was demolished in 1980.

== Competition ==
The club participates in beach, surf, and ocean competitive sporting activities.

Surf Carnivals are held during the summer patrol season, from October until April, at numerous beach locations;

• Locally (most common)

• Branch (clubs within a local geographical area)

• Inter - Branch

• State Titles

• Inter - State

• National Titles (commonly known within the SLSA movement as "AUSSIES")

• Internationally

Members are able to compete in a number of disciplines, under the guise of SLSA- Surf Sports;

• Beach Sprint (90 m)

• Beach Run (2 km)

• Flags

• Ironman / Ironwoman

• Rescue Board Paddling

• Surf Ski Paddling

• Surf Race

• Taplin Relay

• Surf Boat Rowing

• Rescue and Resuscitation (R&R)

• Lifesaving Patrol

• First Aid

• IRB Racing

== See also ==
- Surf lifesaving
- Surf Life Saving Australia
- List of Australian surf lifesaving clubs
