= South Maroubra Surf Life Saving Club =

South Maroubra SLSC
- Full name: South Maroubra Surf Life Saving Club
- Founded: 1959
- Colors: Navy Blue, White & Sky Blue
- Members: 840 senior, 1300 junior
- Website: soutmaroubrasurfclub.com.au

The South Maroubra Surf Life Saving Club is one of Australia's oldest Surf Life Saving Clubs, founded in 1963. The club was established in 1963. The club is situated at the southern end of Maroubra Beach in the eastern suburbs of Sydney.

== See also ==
- Surf lifesaving
- Surf Life Saving Australia
- List of Australian surf lifesaving clubs
