= Darwin Surf Life Saving Club =

- Full name: Darwin Surf Life Saving Club
- Founded: 1982; 44 years ago
- Members: 500 senior, 250 junior

The Darwin Surf Life Saving Club is a foundation member of the surf lifesaving movement in the Northern Territory. It was founded in 1982 on the Casuarina Coastal Reserve in Casuarina, Northern Territory.

== See also ==
- Surf lifesaving
- Surf Life Saving Australia
- List of Australian surf lifesaving clubs
