= North Cottesloe Surf Life Saving Club =

Australian Surf Life Saving Club

- Full name: North Cottesloe Surf Life Saving Club (Incorporated)
- Nickname: North Cott Surf Club, White Caps, North Cott
- Short name: NCSLSC, North Cottesloe SLSC
- Sport: Surf Life Saving
- Founded: 1918
- Members: 1,450 Senior, 150 Youth, 450 Nippers

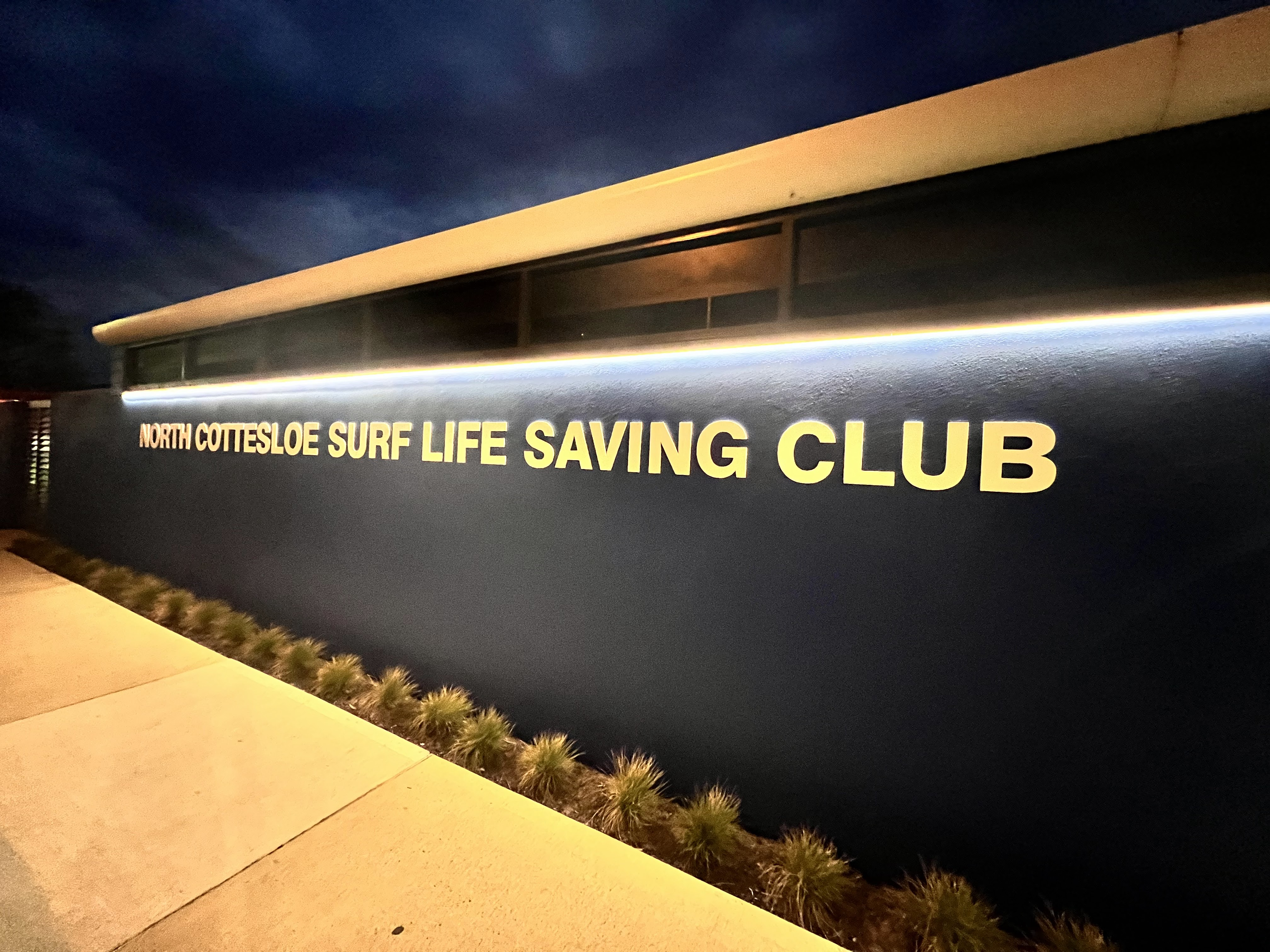
North Cottesloe Surf Life Saving Club: Club House (front)

The North Cottesloe Surf Life Saving Club (NCSLSC) is an Australian surf life saving club located on Cottesloe Beach established in 1918., it is the state's second oldest surf life saving club and is dedicated to patrolling North Cottesloe Beach, training volunteer lifesavers, competing in Surf Life Saving Competition (Surf Sports) and promoting public safety in the aquatic environment.

Founded in 1918 with just 35 members, the club has grown substantially in size over its one hundred plus years, with a membership of greater than 2,000 people, as of the 2023–2024 Surf Life Saving Season

== History ==
North Cottesloe Surf Life Saving Club is the second oldest Surf Life Saving Club in Western Australia, the oldest being Cottesloe Surf Life Saving Club founded in 1909.

Both Cottesloe and North Cottesloe Surf Life Saving Clubs have had a strong rivalry, records going as far back as 1935 document interclub carnivals taking place between the two clubs

== Surf sports ==
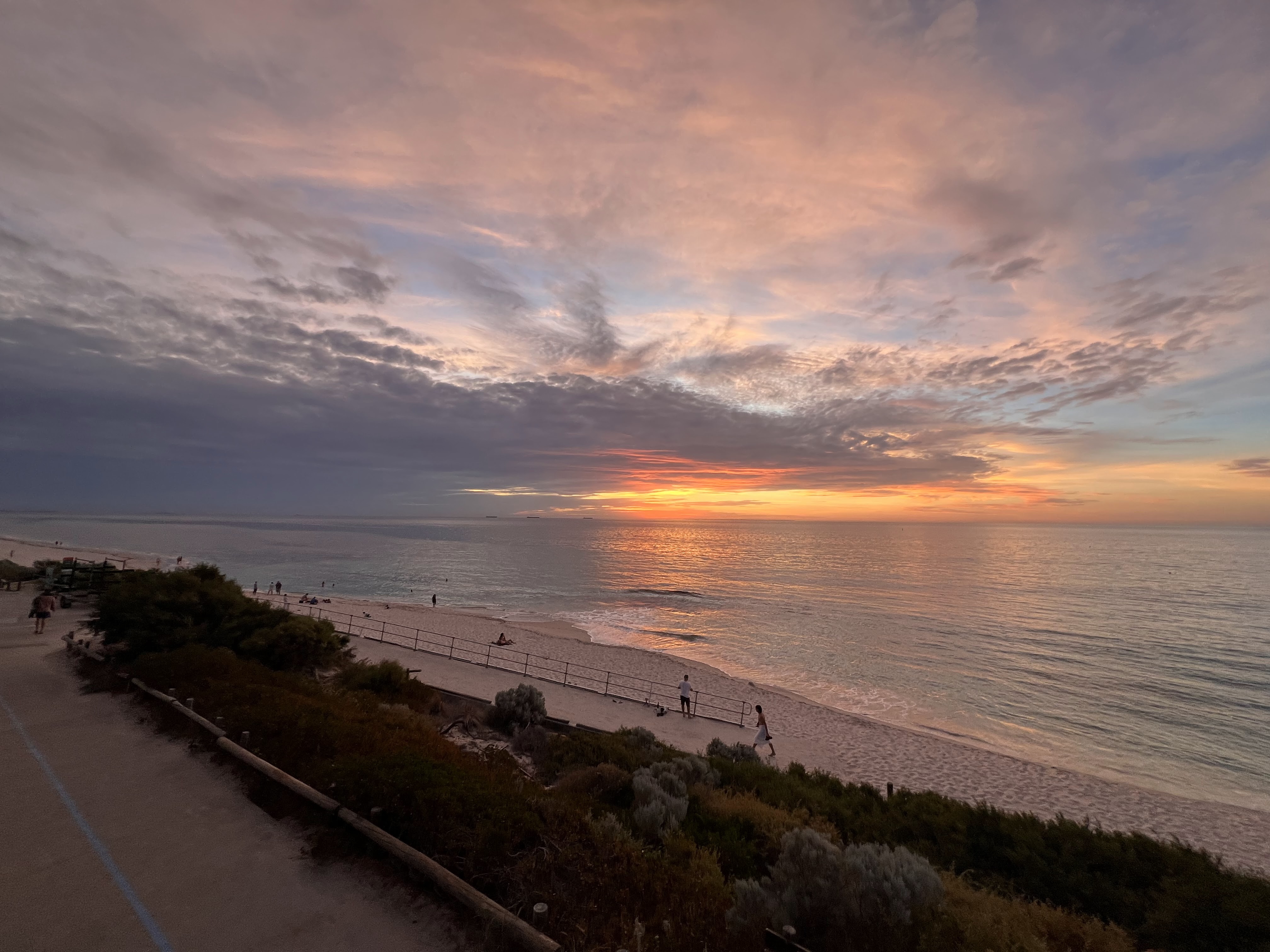
North Cottesloe Beach at Sunset

North Cottesloe Surf Life Saving Club has competed at local, state, and national levels throughout its history with varying levels of success. The club supports athletes in disciplines such as surf boat rowing, surf ski, board paddling, swimming, beach sprints and beach flags.

=== Australian Surf Life Saving Championships ===
NCSLSC has been a regular competitor in the Australian Surf Life Saving Championships, also known as 'The Aussies', despite many of these competitions being held in Queensland and New South Wales. Notwithstanding, athletes from North Cottesloe SLSC have made a number of notable or breakthrough performances, including Jack Trail who became the first member to win an individual Australian Title in the Open Male Ski Race. Simon Martin placing first in the Open Male Ironman Final at the 1974 Aussies held in Glenelg, South Australia.

More recent wins include Stephen Bird and Jesse Phillips winning the Open Male Double Ski and Matthew Lloyd winning the Open Male Beach Sprint at the 2023 Surf Life Saving Championships held in Scarborough, Western Australia.

=== SLSWA State Championships ===
North Cottesloe Surf Life Saving Club has been an active competitor in the Surf Life Saving Western Australia (SLSWA) State Championships, participating in events such as surf boat racing, board and ski races, beach sprints, and ironman competitions. The club has consistently placed among the top teams in the competition, finishing sixth overall at the 2024 State Beach Championships at Sorrento Beach. In the 2022 championships, North Cottesloe finished second overall, closely competing with Trigg Island Surf Life Saving Club, which secured its seventh consecutive state title. The championships provide a competitive platform for clubs across Western Australia, showcasing both athletic performance and surf lifesaving skills.

=== Other competition results ===
At the 2024 Albany Surf Craft Challenge, the North Cottesloe Surf Boat Rowers secured victories in the Open Men’s, Open Women’s, and Under-23 Male divisions.

== Notable members ==
- Malcolm McCusker AC CVO KC
- James Edelman AC
- John Roberts AO
- Rebecca Sattin OLY
- Alicia Molik OLY
- Jesse Phillips OLY
- Stephen Bird OLY
- David Porzig OLY
- Tommaso D'Orsogna OLY
- George Ford OLY
- Andrew Ford OLY

== See also ==
- Town of Cottesloe
- Surf Life Saving Australia
- List of Australian Surf Life Saving Clubs
