= Cronulla Surf Life Saving Club =

Cronulla
- Full name: Cronulla Surf Life Saving Club
- Founded: 1907; 119 years ago
- Colors: Light blue Black White
- Members: 580 seniors, 620 juniors
- Website: cronullasurfclub.com

Uniforms

The Cronulla Surf Life Saving Club, was one of the first surf clubs established in Australia in 1907. The club is located in the southern Sydney suburb of Cronulla, which had very humble beginnings in a tram carriage and today the clubhouse is housed in a magnificent art deco building on the beachfront, that was built in 1940.

Cronulla is one of the largest and strongest clubs in the surf life saving movement with 1,200 members, including 620 in its nipper ranks. Many lifesavers volunteer their time to patrol the beaches during the season from late September to late April. Cronulla has won three World Life Saving Championships encompassing all rescue and Surf Life Saving competitions and has consistently placed in the top 10 clubs at the Australian championships over the past 20 years.

== See also ==
- Surf lifesaving
- Surf Life Saving Australia
- List of Australian surf lifesaving clubs
