= Maroubra Surf Life Saving Club =

- Full name: Maroubra Surf Life Saving Club
- Founded: 1906; 120 years ago
- Members: 500 senior, 250 junior

The Maroubra Surf Life Saving Club is one of Australia's oldest Surf Life Saving Clubs, founded in 1906. The club was established in 1906 the club is situated at the northern end of Maroubra Beach in the South-Eastern Suburbs of Sydney.

== See also ==
- Surf lifesaving
- Surf Life Saving Australia
- List of Australian surf lifesaving clubs
