= Elouera =

Elouera may refer to:

- Elouera Beach in Sydney, Australia
- Elouera, New South Wales, former mining township, now a ghost town, near Cobar, Australia

See also:

- Elouera House - heritage listed nurses' home at Wollongong
- Elouera Street light rail station - light rail stop in Canberra
- Elouera Surf Life Saving Club - life saving club at Elouera Beach

Other

- Elouera Bushland Natural Park - former reserve (name still sometimes used), now part of Berowra Valley National Park
- Elouera Reserve (Macquarie Park)- reserve in the City of Ryde, in metropolitan Sydney
- Elouera Reserve - reserve in City of Liverpool (New South Wales), in metropolitan Sydney
