= Wanda Surf Life Saving Club =

Wanda
- Full name: Wanda Surf Life Saving Club
- Founded: 1946; 80 years ago
- Members: 500 senior, 250 junior

The Wanda Surf Lifesaving Club was established in 1946 after World War II by a group of men who banded together, from the North Cronulla Surf Life Saving Club who were being asked to patrol this stretch of beach, being a considerable distance from the Cronulla area. The colours of Army red, Air Force blue, and Navy blue were adopted as the club colours. The club, located on Marine Esplanade, has grown in size to its current membership of over 900 male and female members, ranging in age from five-year-old Nippers to the original Founding Members.

The primary objective of the club is to patrol the beach in an effort to ensure the safety of the surfing public but it is also actively involved in the competition arena, with excellent performances at State and National Competitions. A number of social activities are organised throughout the year to bring together members from all sections of the club.

== See also ==
- Surf lifesaving
- Surf Life Saving Australia
- List of Australian surf lifesaving clubs
