= Mark Salmon =

Mark Salmon may refer to:

- Mark Salmon (footballer) (born 1988), Irish footballer
- Mark Salmon (surf lifesaver) (born 1967), Australian surf lifesaver
