= Bronte Surf Lifesaving Club =

Surf lifesaving club at Bronte Beach, Sydney

Bronte
- Full name: Bronte Surf Life Saving Club
- Founded: 1903
- Members: 500 senior, 250 junior

The Bronte Surf Lifesaving Club (BSLSC) is a surf lifesaving club in Bronte, New South Wales, Australia. It was founded in 1903 and the movement has since spread to other parts of New South Wales and the rest of the country.

== History of the club ==
The club rests on Aboriginal land, and while there is no clear evidence for the name or names of the Eora people who lived in what is now the Waverley area, most sources agree on the Cadigal, but some sources name the Biddigal and Birrabirragal bands as well.

After swimming became more acceptable amongst society in the very late 1800s, the rate of drownings increased significantly at Bronte beach and other beaches across NSW. As such, it became obvious that there was a need for some system to protect people who had ventured into the surf. Although there were no surf clubs there were swimming clubs up and down the east coast of Australia with groups of individuals who became the unofficial surf lifesavers. William Henry a renowned English and European swimming champion in the 1880s and 90s approached the Royal Humane Society to develop a lifesaving programme. This resulted in the formation of the Swimmers Life Saving Society, later changed to Life Saving Society.

In 1883, Henry who was the secretary of the lifesaving society gave a copy of the handbook, which outlined rescue and resuscitation methods, to Frank Lloyd, who was the caretaker at Bronte Baths and the secretary of the NSW Amateur Swimming association. Lloyd gave the handbook to John Bond, a Warrant officer in Sydney's Medical Corps, and Captain Arthur Holmes. On 31 July 1894 Bond and Holmes were instrumental in the establishment of the lifesaving society in Australia in the Sydney suburb of Waverley. Throughout 1894 both Bond and Holmes put on three surf lifesaving demonstrations in which around eighteen men were versed in various lifesaving methods. These men would go on to be the first in Australia to receive the Bronze Medallion.

Although surf bathing was becoming more acceptable in society it was still illegal to swim on the beach in daylight hours. In the early 1900s authorities were coming under immense pressure to legalise surf bathing. In September 1902 English born newspaper journalist, William Gocher, advertised that he was going to defy the authorities and swim at noon on three consecutive Sundays at Manly beach. Gocher's protest worked and started the Australian tradition of "going to the beach".

Now that bathing at all times of the day was legalised, drownings increased significantly. On boxing day 1902 a swimmer, William Fox, was swept out to sea at Bronte's south end Despite the efforts of locals, Fox ended up drowning. Fox's death shook the Bronte community resulting in Waverley council purchasing lifesaving equipment and legitimising the unofficial surf lifesavers at Bronte Beach. This led to the creation of the Bronte Surf Bathers Lifesaving Club (later changed to the Bronte Surf lifesaving Club) in 1903.

== Women and BSLSC ==
Women were unable to join BSLSC and other lifesaving clubs around NSW as it was believed that they were not strong enough to operate the heavy equipment or manoeuvre themselves through the surf. Despite this two women, Annie Brown and Fanny Durack, established the Eastern Suburbs Ladies Amateur swimming club in 1916 (ESLASC). However, the group was closed down during World War Two and was re-established as the Bronte Ladies Amateur Swimming club (BLASC) in 1946. However, the issue of women becoming fully-fledged members of the surf club continued to be raised, and came to a head in 1977 with Lindsay Donnan. Donnan's brothers were members of BSLSC and she wanted to become an active member. The BSLC called a general meeting to discuss her application to become a member. A large number of people attended the meeting, and many had strong opinions as to why women should not be allowed to participate in surf lifesaving. Donnan's application was denied, and she later stated that "for me, it was sad and very hurtful. People were rude. I was shunned and I felt isolated, as if I was not welcome at the beach".

It was not until 1980 with the passing of the Anti-discrimination Act that women were able to become members of surf lifesaving clubs across Australia.

== Evolution of surf lifesaving equipment and techniques ==
In the early days of surf lifesaving there were no flags to signal safe places to swim and there was no organised patrol system in place. If there was any trouble on the beach and alarm bell would ring, signalling all members on the beach to move to where the problem was occurring and to help. A lookout tower was also built in which a man would climb and wave flags around to signal to other surf lifesavers on the beach that someone was in trouble. Later ropes that were attached to wooden stakes at various points along the beach were thrown into the water when someone was in trouble. However, the wooden stakes were often quite flimsy leading to awkward rescues. This led to the surf life reel, which was invented at Bondi in 1906 by Lyster Ormsby, who made a model of his invention from a cotton-reel and two hairpins. According to Vesper, "the surf lifesaving reel, which is still used today in competition, was the basic surf lifesaving aid for many years…it wasn’t until the 1970s that it was phased out".

In 1906 the first Australian purpose-built surfboat was invented by Bronte Surf lifesaving club member Walter Biddell. It was a "catamaran type boat" with kapok-stuffed torpedo shaped tubes made of wood, tin and canvas. Biddell later designed the "Albatross" surf boat.

== Rescues ==
Whilst the surf boats were initially used in rescues, today they are purely used for competition purposes. In the early days, apart from the surf boats, the reel and belt, surf lifesavers began experimenting with a variety of devices to help with the job. Surfboards and surf skis were adapted from being sports of pleasure to being used in rescues. Surfboards today are instrumental tools in conducting successful and safe rescues.

== Notable rescues ==
Before the advent of shark nets in 1937, Bronte, along with other beaches in Sydney's east had frequent shark sightings. In the early hours of Wednesday 13 February 1924, a 30-year-old women Nita Derritt, was badly attacked and mauled by 10 ft (3.0 m) shark at Bronte Beach. Bronte lifesavers Eric Bennett and Jim Brown ran bravely into the water and rescued Nita. Her leg had been bitten off below the knee and her right foot had been torn off. Nita Derritt survived the attack after both of her legs were amputated.

On Saturday 1 February 2020, off-duty lifeguards at Bronte Surf Lifesaving Club performed a mass rescue at Bronte Beach. According to Surf Lifesaving NSW, James McLennan, then club captain at Bronte Surf Club, and his wife Kirsty were relaxing at their home at Bronte Beach when they noticed a large group of people caught in a rip at Bronte. After James reached the swimmers caught in the rip, he realised there were actually nine people in the group – not the six he first thought. All were rescued. James and Kirsty McLennan were awarded "SLSNSW Rescue of the Month" for their rescue.

== Significant events ==
In the early hours 20 April 1972, a devastating fire broke out which destroyed the clubhouse at Bronte. An electrical fault was suspected to have caused the fire; however, some people did not believe that it was an electrical fire. Others believe that the fire was long overdue: "There was no chance of putting it out. It was going too well. The fire spread through the roof and within minutes it was a blazing fire. There has been a lot of conjecture whether the fire was a godsend or a tragedy. It was past its used by date".

Following the Cronulla riots in 2005, Surf Lifesaving Australia, along with Bronte Surf Lifesaving Club, formed an alliance with the Sutherland Shire Council and the (then) Department of Immigration and Multicultural Affairs to establish the "On the same wave" program. According to Surf Lifesaving Australia, the program "aims to increase Surf Life Saving's openness and responsiveness to cultural diversity and increase diversity within clubs".

== World War II ==
On 31 May 1942, three Japanese submarines came into Sydney harbour and sank the Australian depot ship Kuttabul, killing 21 sailors. On 8 June 1942, Bondi, Dover Heights, Bellevue Hill and Paddington were hit by shells fired by a Japanese Submarine. Following the attacks on Sydney shores, authorities fortified Bronte beach with barbed wire. To reach the water at Bronte, beachgoers had to zigzag back and forth between rows of barbed wire stretched along the sand. Searchlights were positioned on the hill at the northern end and machine guns were placed on the promenade in front of the surf club and in front of the baths.

== See also ==
- Surf lifesaving
- Surf Life Saving Australia
- List of Australian surf lifesaving clubs
