= Sports carnival =

Sports festival in Australia

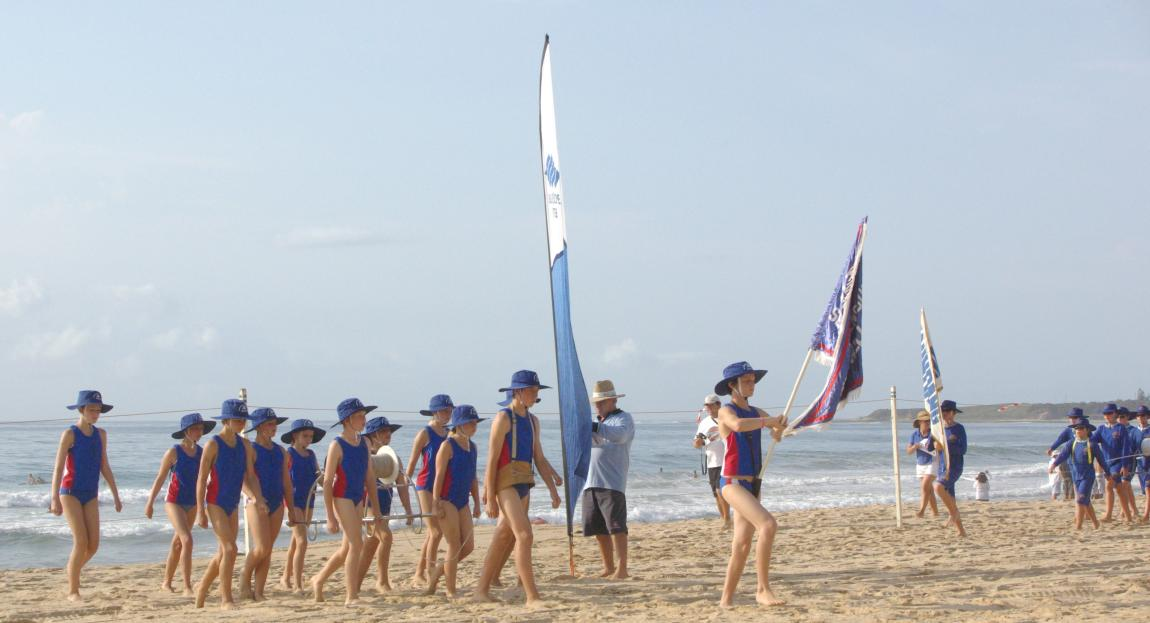
Nippers marching at a surf carnival.

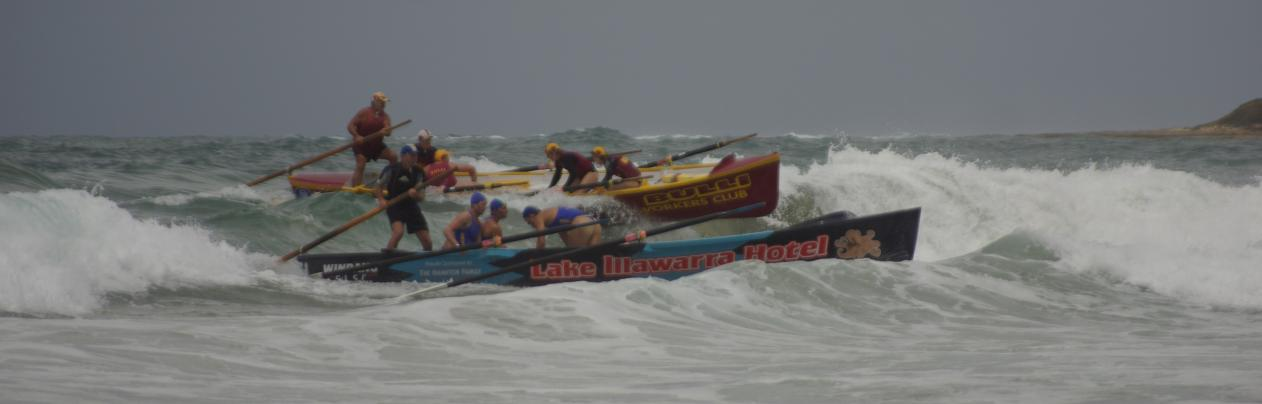
Surf boat competition during a surf carnival.

In Australian culture sports carnivals are held to perform competitions in the individual or team disciplines like athletics, swimming or surf lifesaving. Teams from different clubs or schools gather together for both individual point-score and team score. Often, the carnival is opened by a parade with the teams marching in uniforms and flags over the field of competition.

== Surf carnival ==
Surf Life Saving Clubs in Australia train their nippers and young life savers for competitions in surf carnivals. Local, regional, state and nationwide competitions are held across the country. Junior carnivals compete for age groups starting from under-8 to under-14, while senior competitions among active surf life savers start from under-15 to veterans. Veterans are athletes 30 years and older; the age groups are in 5-year blocks: 30–34, 35–39, 40–44, all the way up to 65+. Surf boat competitions start from 16+.

== See also ==
- Sports day
- The Coolangatta Gold
