= Mark Salmon (surf lifesaver) =

Australian surf lifesaver and rugby union player

Mark A. Salmon (born 1967 in Sydney New South Wales,) is a former Australian surf lifesaver and rugby union player who played for the Australian Army, Port Hacking and Southern Districts Rugby Club in the Sydney Rugby Premiership. Mark Salmon was a member of Royal Australian Electrical and Mechanical Engineers RAEME for five years as well as serving with 2nd Cavalry Regiment (Australia) 2CAV, A Squadron based in Darwin N.T and 1st Battalion, Royal Australian Regiment 1RAR over subsequent years of Service.

Mark Salmon is a current Member of Wanda Surf Life Saving Club (Long Service) and a Former member of Elouera Surf Life Saving Club. Salmon has served as both Club Vice Captain and Club Captain of Wanda Surf Life Saving Club between 1992 and 1997. In 1994 Salmon was awarded The Meritorious Award Bronze (Medallion 107) Medallion for Bravery in Surf Rescue, the highest bravery honour in Australian Surf Life Saving for successfully completing a solo cliff rescue in Burleigh Head National Park, Queensland. Salmon received numerous citations for Bravery over many years of Surf Life Saving before retiring from Active Service at the conclusion of Season 2009.
