= Elouera Surf Life Saving Club =

Australian surf lifesaving club

Elouera
- Full name: Elouera Surf Life Saving Club
- Founded: 1966; 60 years ago
- Members: 500 senior, 250 junior

The Elouera Surf Lifesaving Club is an Australian surf lifesaving club in Cronulla, New South Wales.

The club was established in 1966. On the official opening of the clubhouse on 8 June 1967, the club's first surf boat Charlotte Breen, donated by local businessman Tom Breen, was christened and launched.

The Elouera "Sharks" had 375 members in the initial season.

== See also ==
- Surf lifesaving
- Surf Life Saving Australia
- List of Australian surf lifesaving clubs
