= Bondi Surf Bathers' Life Saving Club =

Club in New South Wales, Australia

Bondi
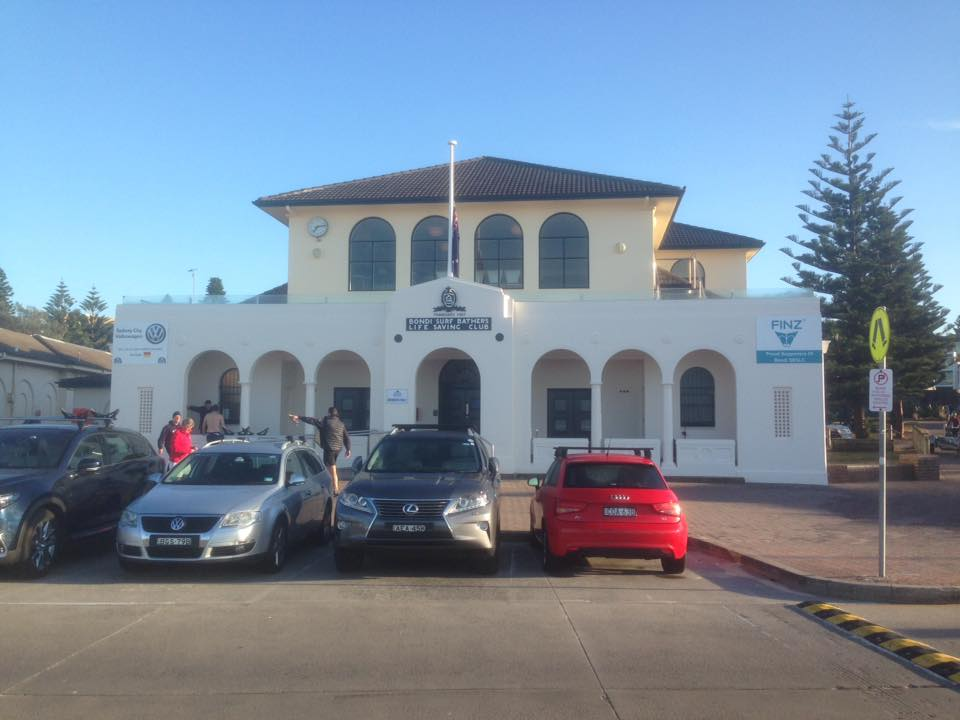
- Founded: 1907 (119 years ago)
- Colors: Navy Blue / White
- Members: 1435 (2018)
- Website: Official website

The Bondi Surf Bathers' Life Saving Club is Australia's oldest Surf Life Saving Club, founded in 1907 in Bondi, New South Wales The club is a volunteer organisation that patrols Bondi Beach from October to April every year.

== Bondi Beach ==
=== Sea bathing at Bondi ===
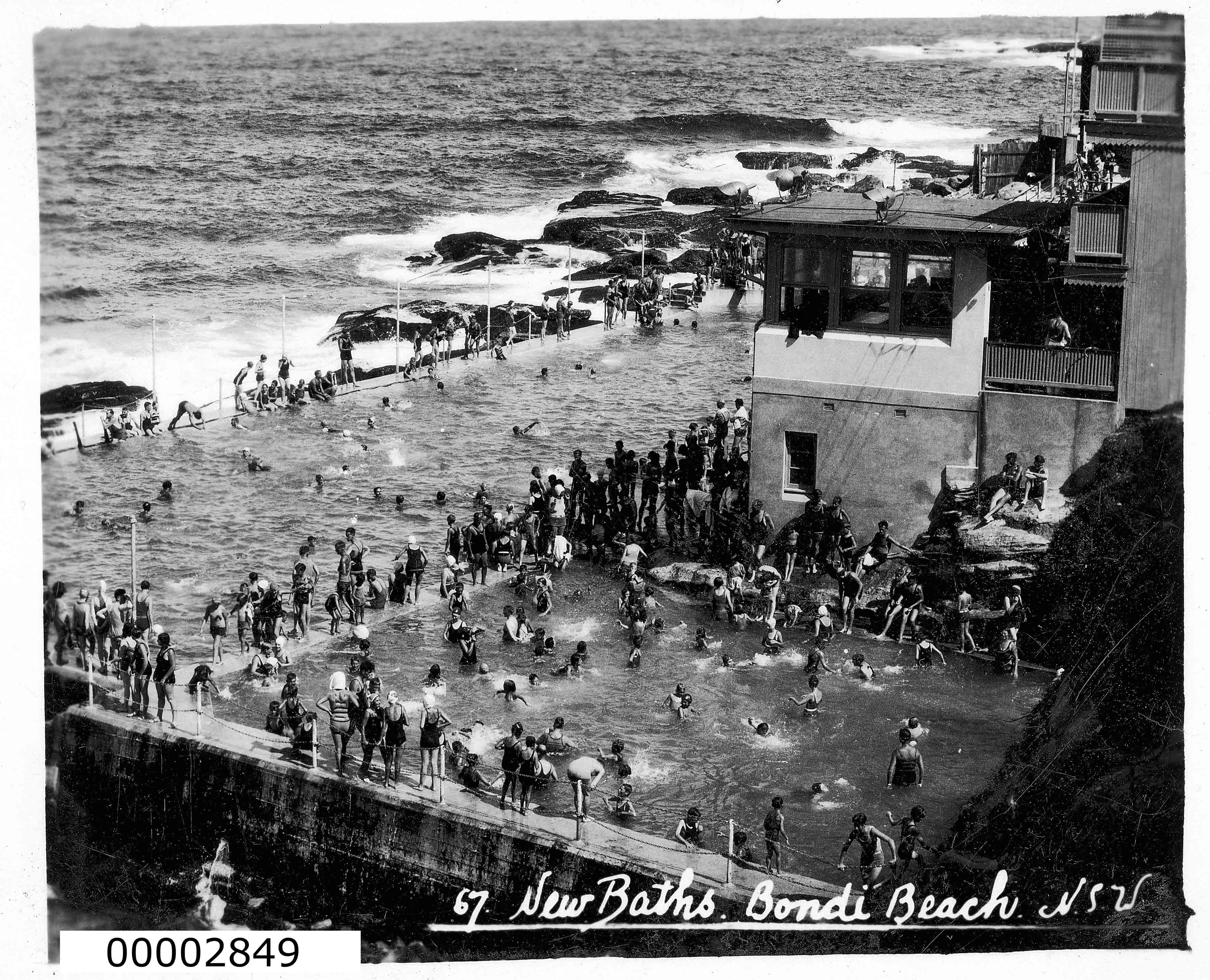
Bondi Baths (1930).

The first reference to any settler entering the water at Bondi, was reported in the Sydney Gazette in 1818, "A young man of the name of Allen, clerk to Messrs. Jones and Riley, was drowned on Sunday last at Bundye [sic], by venturing within the surf, which was very high and rapid at the time."

In 1888, what had originally been little more than a rock pool at the south-eastern end of Bondi Beach was converted into the longer, wider, and deeper ocean pool, known as the Bondi Baths, allowing pool swimming in sea water that was regularly refreshed by the tide.

The Bondi Swimming Club was formed at a meeting, in Bondi, on 17 February 1893, and its first intraclub event (100 Yards Handicap) was contested on 4 March 1893 at the Bondi Baths, its home base.

=== Bodysurfing ===
According to Booth (2016, pp.26-29), the question of who was the first bodysurfer at Bondi will never be settled, given the difficulty in (historically) separating the true bodysurfers at Bondi from (a) those who went to Bondi to just paddle ankle-deep at the ocean's edge, (b) those who, knee-deep, "happily splash[ed] themselves and others, without ever revealing the confidence to float, swim or surf in the water" (Jaggard, 2007, pp. 90-91), (c) those who (during the droughts of the mid-1890s) were being encouraged to conduct their ablutions in the sea (Jaggard, 2006, p.31), (d) those who were pool swimming at Bondi Baths, and (e) those who were simply open water swimming at Bondi — rather than bodysurfing.

On 2 January 1907 two 9-year-old boys were rescued at Bondi Beach, having been swept out to sea by a strong undertow. One was safely brought to shore; whilst the other was brought to shore unconscious and revived by the "restorative measures" by a nurse who happened to be at the scene.

=== Reginald Bourne ===
On Sunday 10 February 1907 a number of swimmers were caught in an undertow at Bondi Beach. Two distressed swimmers were eventually rescued with the aid of the lifeline. A body, later identified as Reginald Bourne, was discovered the next day floating in shallow water at Bondi Beach.

== Bondi Surf Bathers' Life Saving Club ==
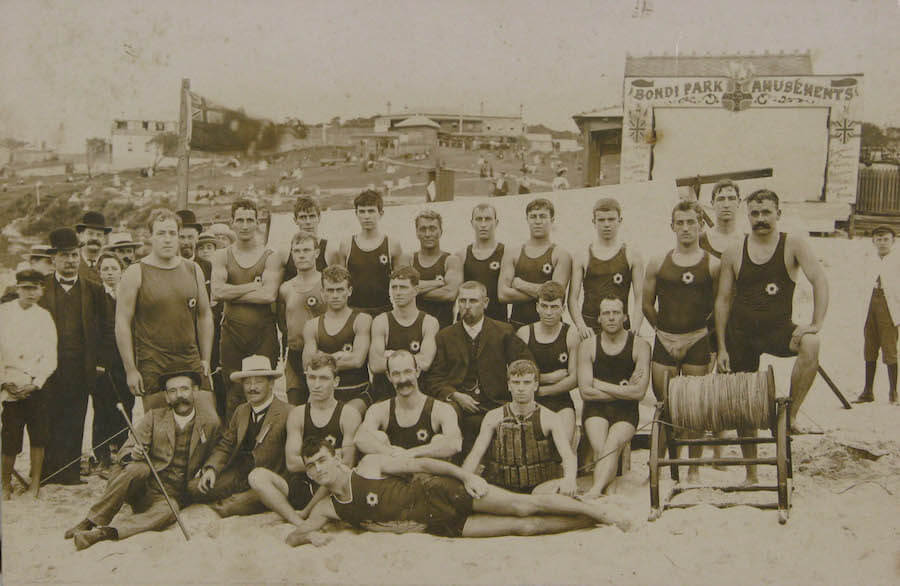
The Bondi Surf Bathers' Life Saving Club (24 March 1907): the Club's original members in club costume, displaying the reel, line, and harness. The inventor of the reel, Lyster Ormsby, is the lifesaver at the left of the back row.

The Bondi Surf Bathers' Life Saving Club, Australia's oldest Surf Life Saving Club, was established in 1907. Although the identities and number of those who attended the 21 February 1907 inaugural meeting are not known, it is certain that, based upon the subsequent (1919) award of life membership, there were 23 "original" club members. A cropped version of the photograph taken at Bondi Beach on 24 March 1907 (TCJ.1) that was published a year and a half later (SSS.1) identified the 20 "original" members in the club uniform (‡) that were present at the time the photograph was taken.

- John O. Bond, ‡ A.A.M.C. (1855-1927) (hon. instructor)
- Carew Dillon Cadden ‡ (1886-1958)
- Robert Labertouche Cadden (1889-1917)
- Lawrence Corbett ‡
- Francis Joseph Craven ‡ (1883-1947)
- Arthur Claud Hamilton Dee (1871-1940)
- Cleon Dennis ‡ (1888-1932)
- Spencer Dennis ‡ (1886-1954)
- Sydney George Dunrich ‡ (1885-1922)
- Harry S. Evans ‡
- Percival Horace Flynn ‡ (1886-1949)
- Albert Lloyd Fullwood ‡ (1886-1963)
- Sydney Fullwood ‡ (1887-1952)
- Leslie Macbryde Harris ‡ (1884-1951)
- George Herbert Henriques ‡ (1862-1938)
- Eden Percival Love ‡ (1874-1947)
- Thomas Brunel Midelton, M.C. (1884-1965)
- Desmond O’Brien ‡ (1884-1944)
- Rupert O’Brien ‡ (1886-1940)
- Gerald Irwin "Budge" Ormsby (1887—1953) ‡
- Lyster Charles Irwin Ormsby ‡
- Albert Sydney Keith Piddington ‡ (1886-1950)
- Alfred Francis Ray ‡ (1891-1971)

== "The Reel" ==
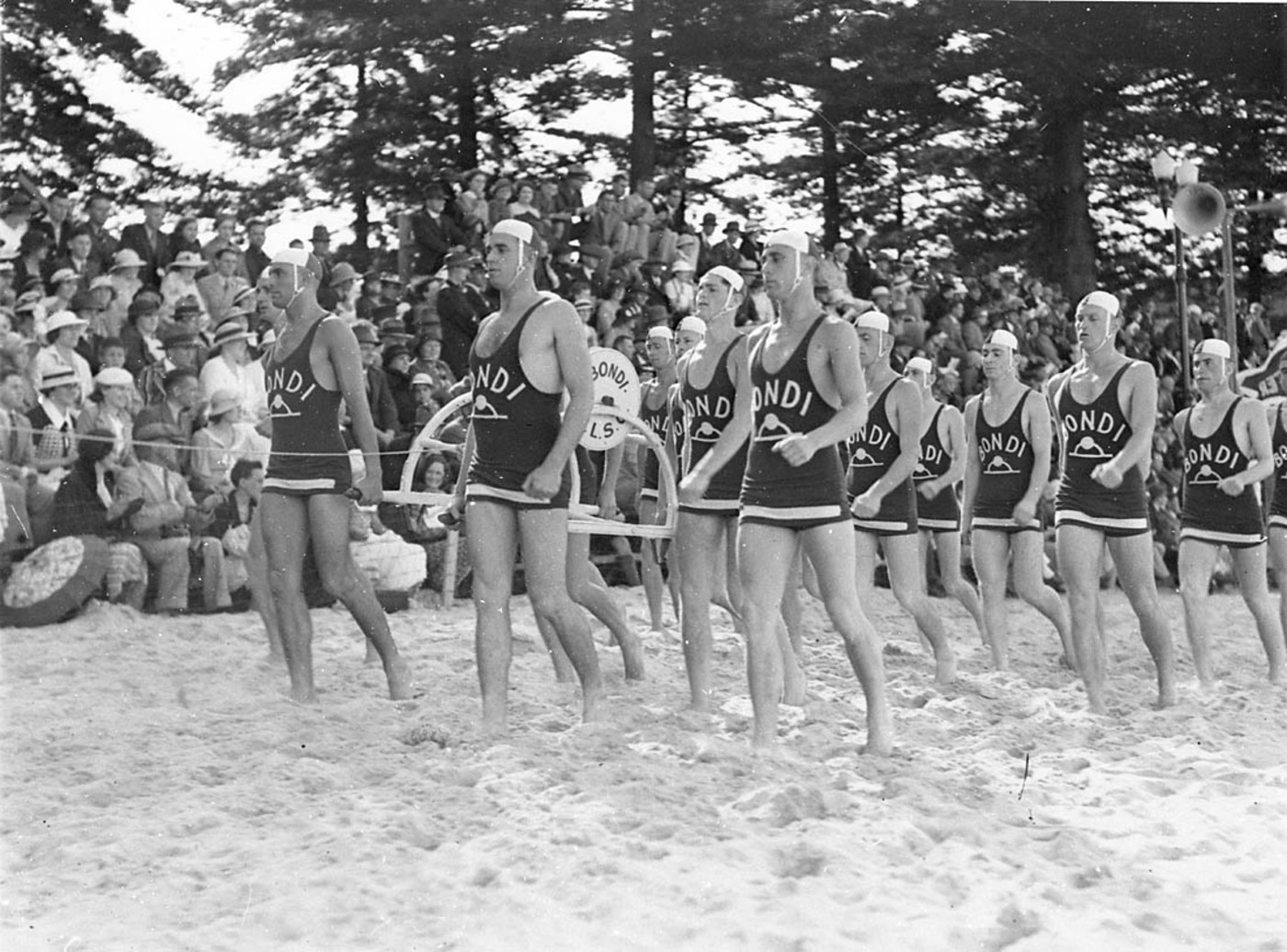
Bondi Surf Bathers' Life Saving Club team (with reel) in competition march past

The Surf Line and Belt (commonly called "the Reel") was chosen as the logo of the Bondi Surf Bathers' Life Saving Club because Lyster Charles Irwin Ormsby (1885-1941), one of the Club's founding members and its first Club Captain, was responsible for its creation.

Ormsby constructed a model "contrived from hair pins and a cotton reel" and took it to Olding and Parker, the Paddington coachbuilders, who built the surf reel that was displayed and first used on Bondi Beach on 23 December 1906. Ormsby's apparatus — reel, cotton (coated in beeswax) line, and harness — allowed a lifesaver, wearing a cork jacket, to swim out and reach a patient and, then, both would be pulled back to the shore, per medium of the line connecting the cork jacket to the reel, by the crew on the beach. Ormsby's reel, line, and harness apparatus was soon proving itself to be far superior to the previously standard lifeline.

== Competition ==
Bondi is the 2018 & 2017 Australian Masters Champions in the Australian Titles and 2017 Australian Pool Rescue Championships.

== Commemoration ==
In November 2023 it was announced that the club was one of 14 people or places commemorated in the second round of blue plaques sponsored by the Government of New South Wales alongside Kathleen Butler, godmother of Sydney Harbour Bridge; Emma Jane Callaghan, an Aboriginal midwife and activist; Susan Katherina Schardt; journalist Dorothy Drain; writer Charmian Clift; Beryl Mary McLaughlin, one of the first three women to graduate in architecture from the University of Sydney; Grace Emily Munro, Sir William Dobell, Syms Covington, Ioannis (Jack) and Antonios (Tony) Notaras; Ken Thomas of Thomas Nationwide Transport and the first release of myxomatosis.

== See also ==
- Bondi Beach Cultural Landscape
- Surf lifesaving
- Surf Life Saving Australia
- List of Australian surf lifesaving clubs
