= Elouera Beach =

Beach in Sydney, Australia

- Beach
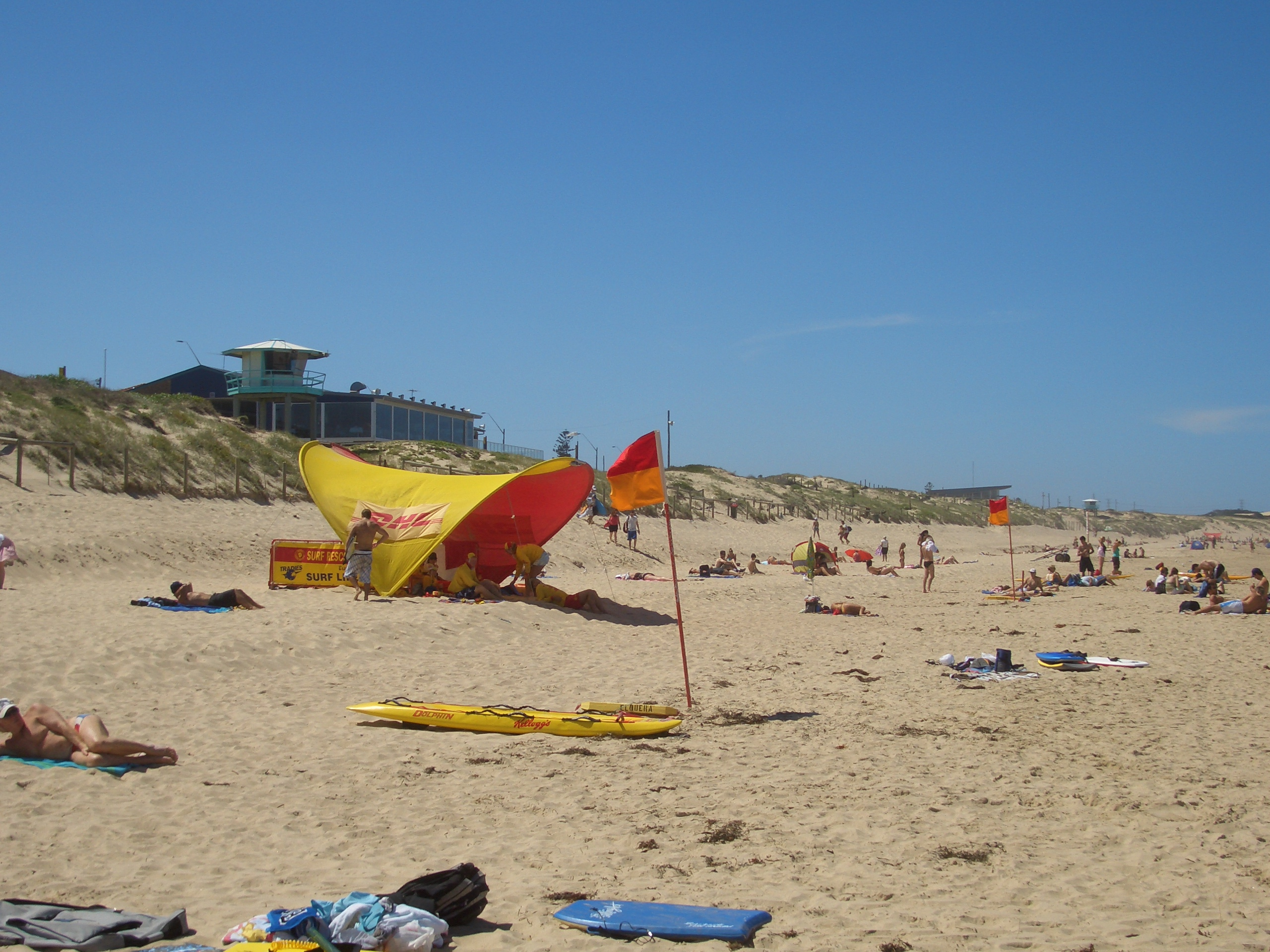
- View of Eloura looking north
- Interactive map of Elouera Beach
- Coordinates: 34°02′47″S 151°09′34″E
- Location: Cronulla, Sydney, New South Wales, Australia

Dimensions
  - Length: 350 m (1,150 ft)
- Patrolled by: Elouera Surf Life Saving Club
- Hazard rating: 6/10 (moderately hazardous)

Elouera Beach or Elouera is a patrolled beach on Bate Bay, in Cronulla, Sydney, New South Wales, Australia. The Wall is the local name given to the area between North Cronulla Beach and Elouera.

== History ==
Elouera is an Aboriginal word meaning a pleasant place.

== Elouera Surf Lifesaving Club ==
The Elouera Surf Lifesaving Club was established in 1966. On the official opening of the clubhouse on 8 June 1967, the club's first surf boat Charlotte Breen, donated by local businessman Tom Breen, was christened and launched. The Elouera "Sharks" had 375 members in the initial season.

== Gallery ==
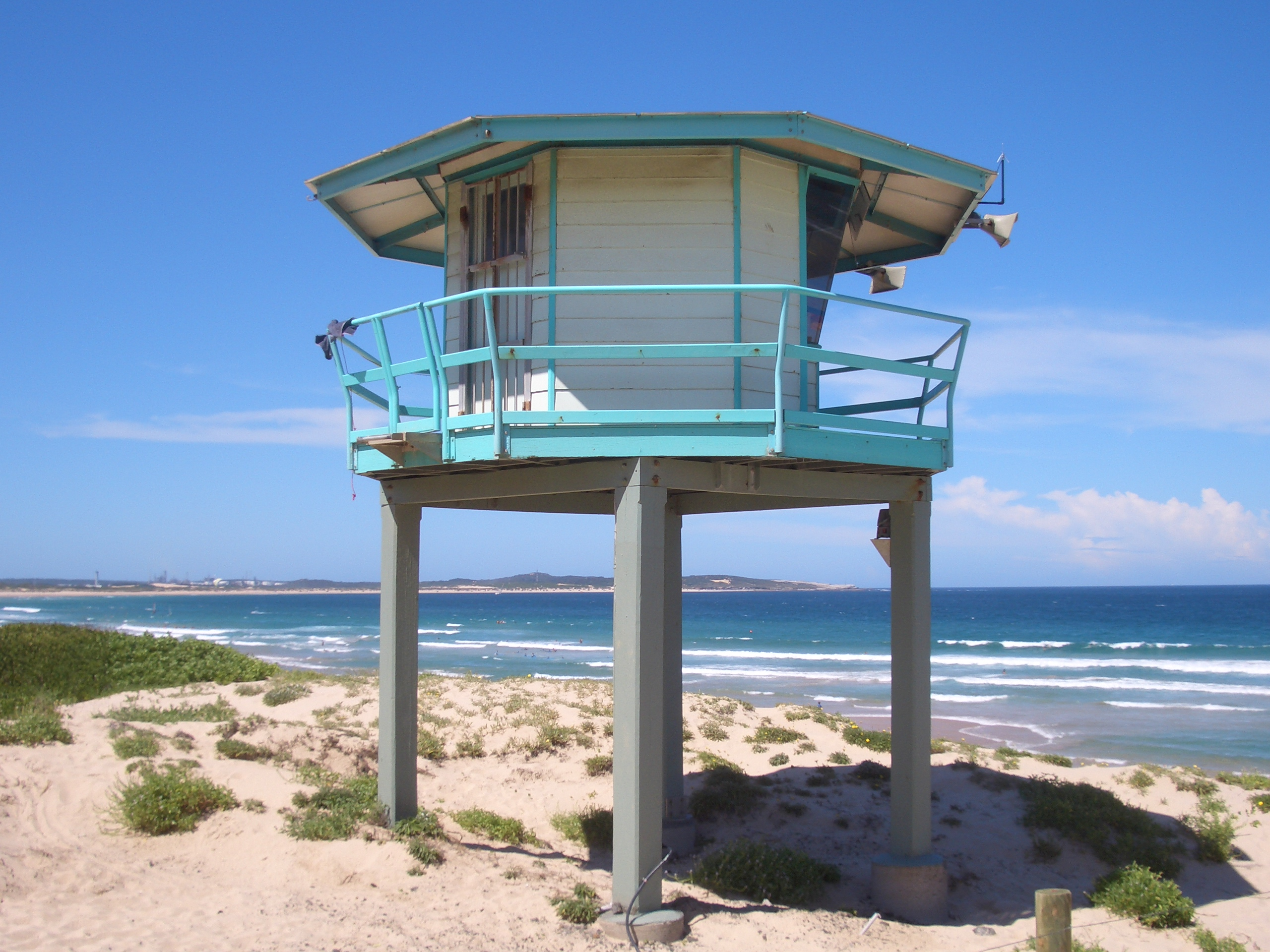
Elouera Beach tower

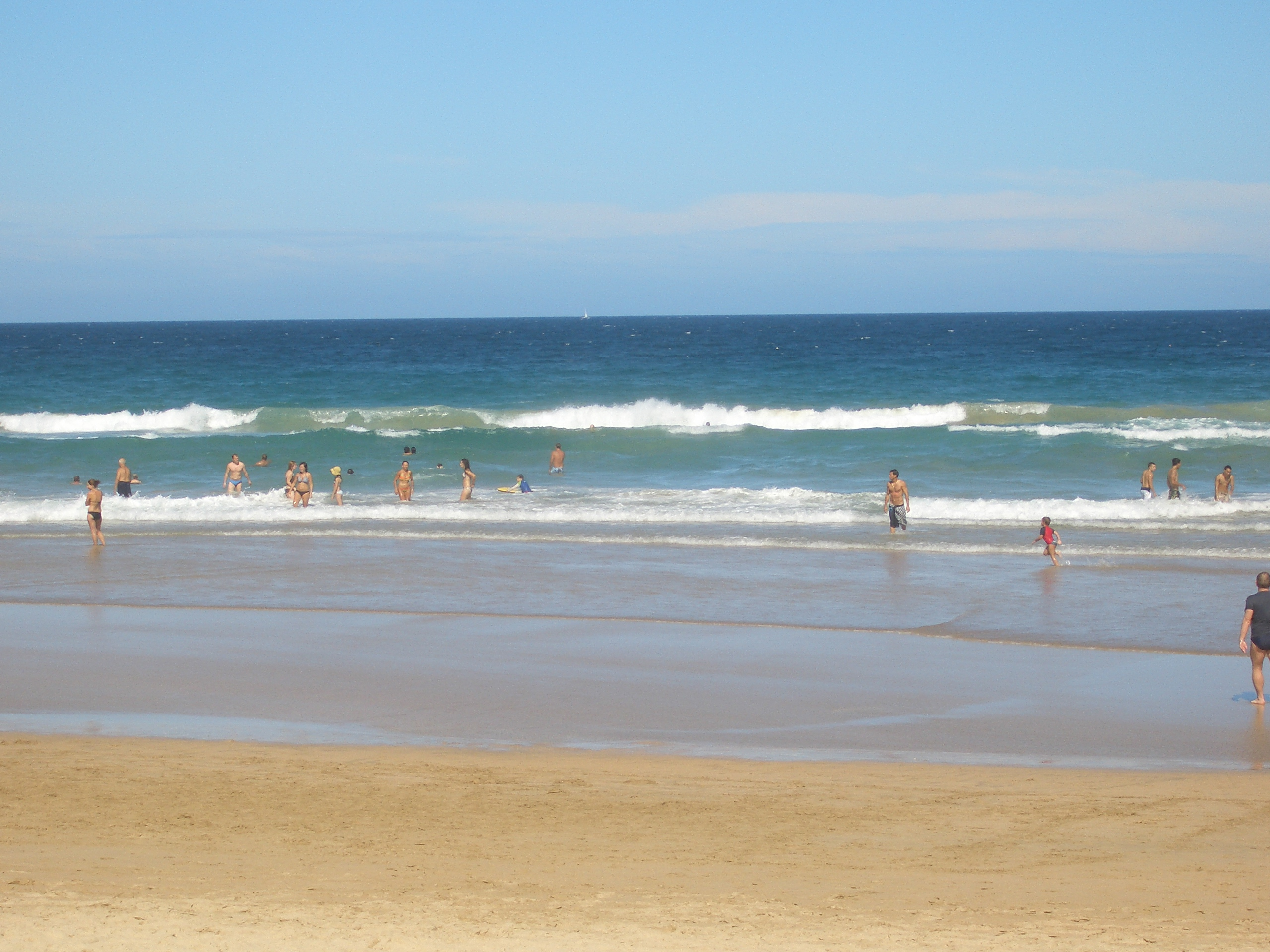
Elouera Beach

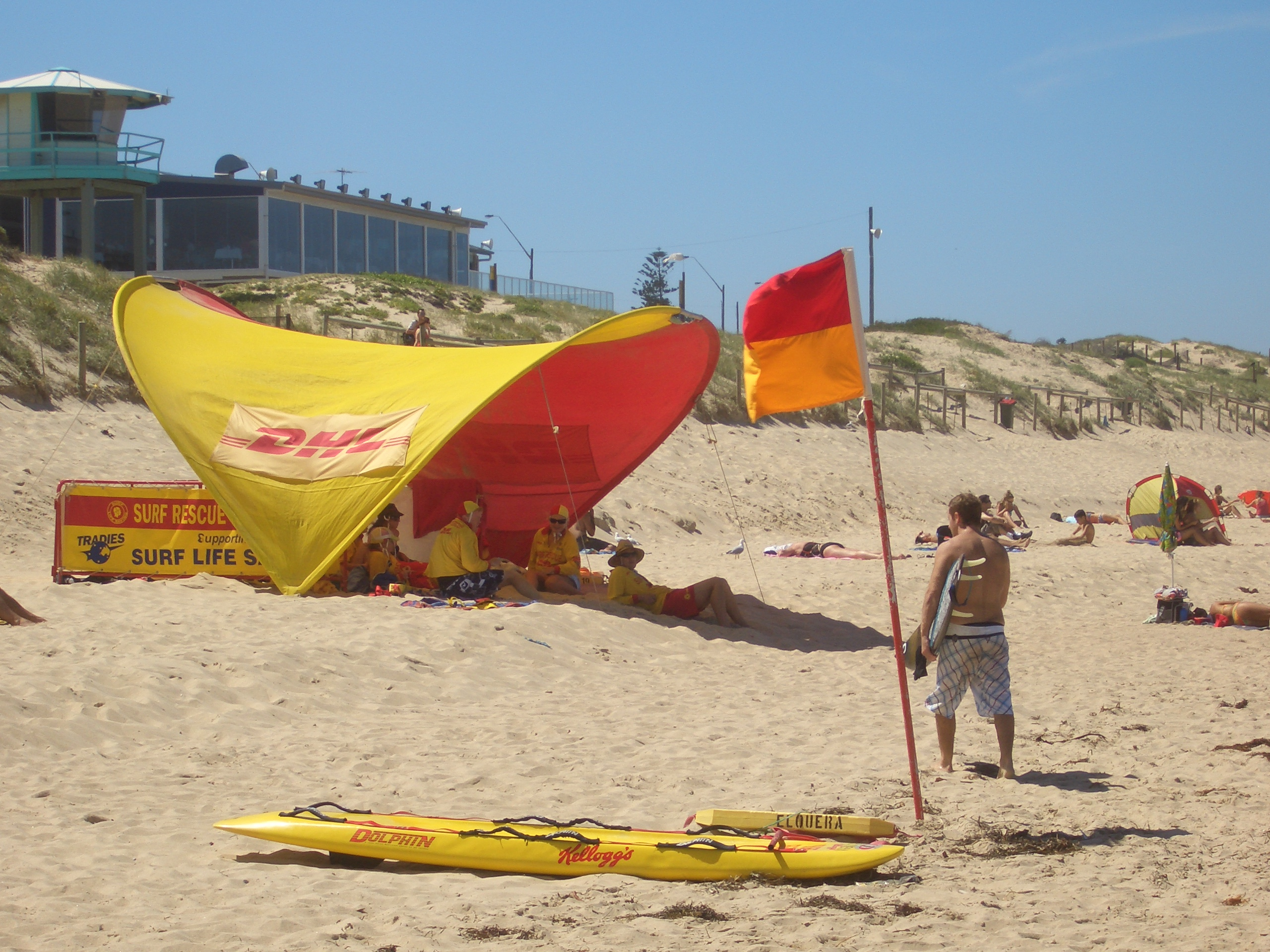
Elouera Beach lifesavers

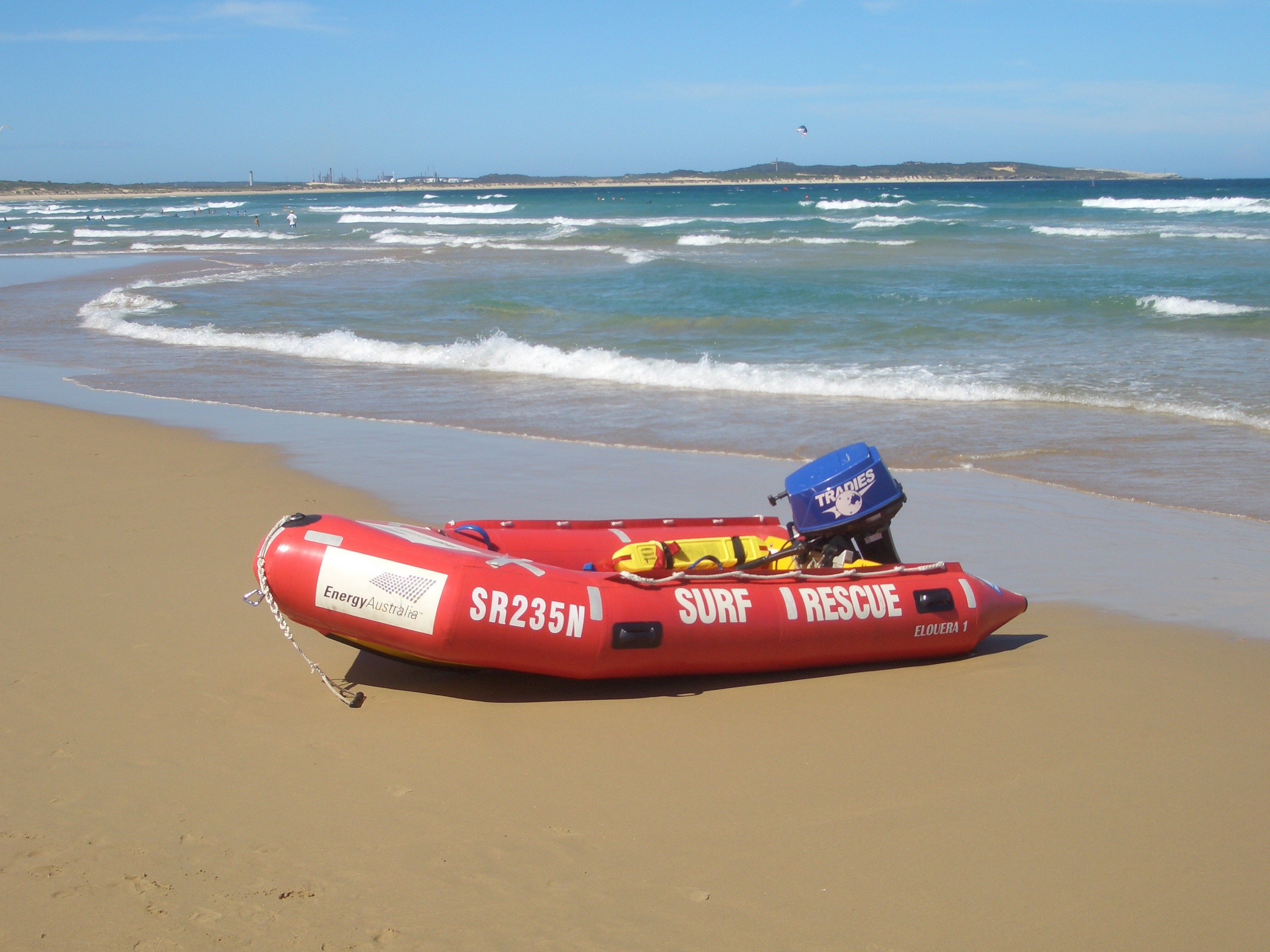
Elouera Beach lifesaving boat

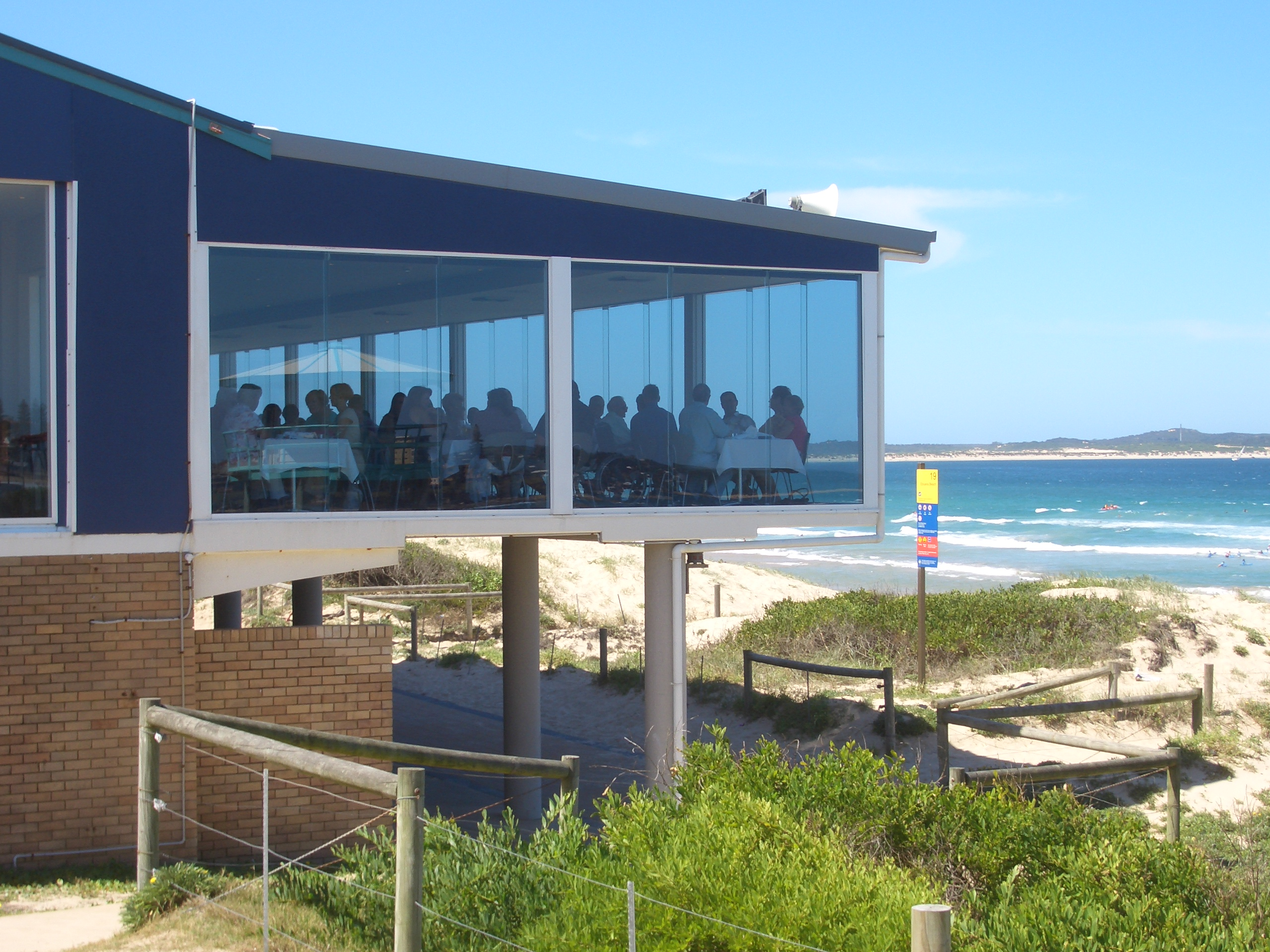
Summer Salt Restaurant

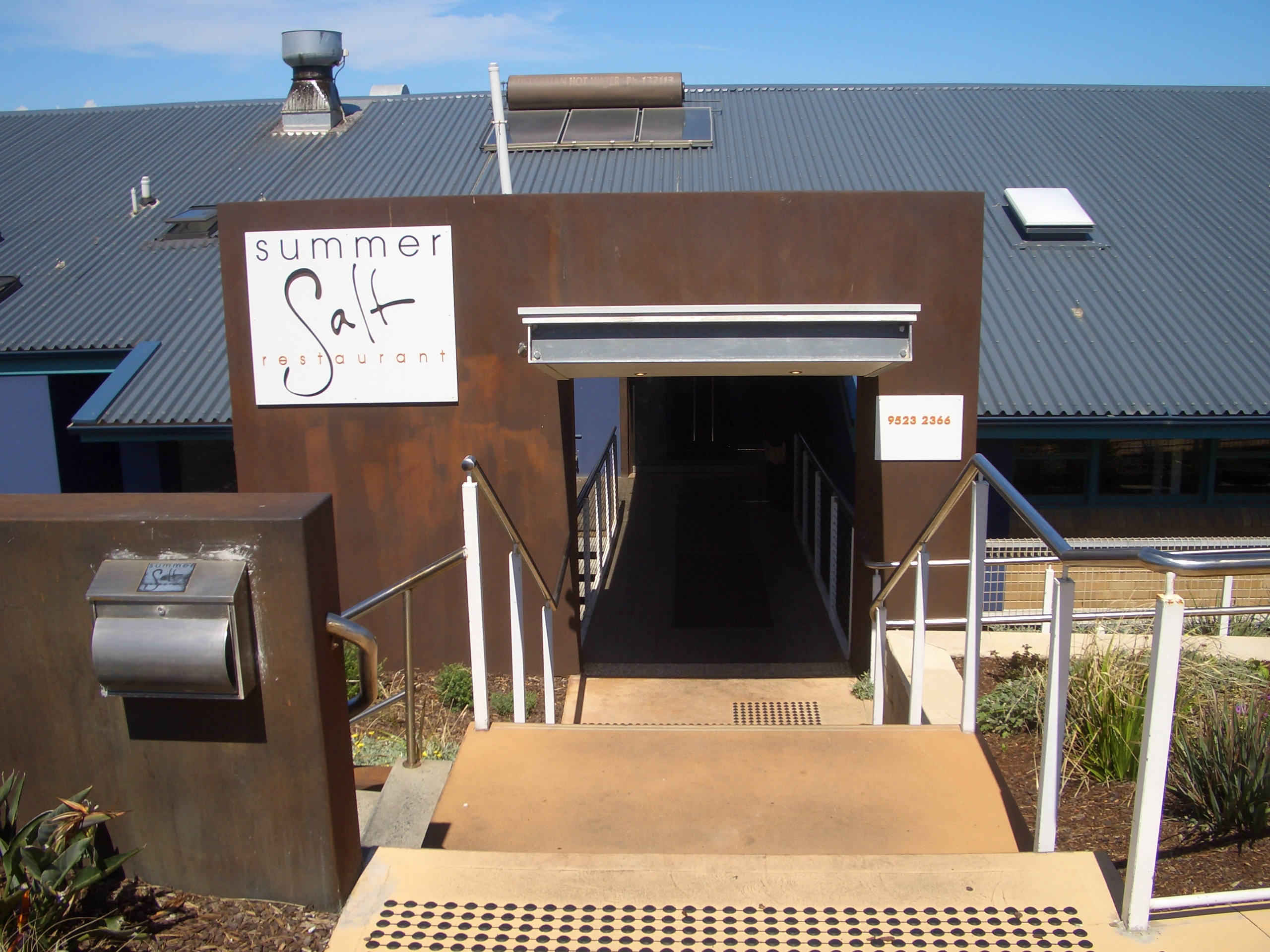
Summer Salt Restaurant

== See also ==
- Beaches in Sydney
- Cronulla sand dunes, Kurnell Peninsula
