= Australian Water Safety Council =

The Australian Water Safety Council (AWSC) was officially formed in February 1998 as a result of strong industry consultation and with the support of the then Federal Minister for Sport & Tourism, The Honourable Andrew Thomson MP.

The Australian Water Safety Council acts as a consultative forum comprising the major water safety and related government agencies and focuses on the presentation of key water safety issues to governments, industry and the community.

The Australian Water Safety Council does not represent an additional layer of organisational bureaucracy and does not receive funding directly. The Council provides a collective voice for its member organisations. It liaises closely with kindred bodies at State, National and International levels.

The AWSC is committed to improving Water Safety in Australia as demonstrated through the production and implementation of two National Water Safety Plans. These plans have generated bipartisan support for Water Safety in Australia and have seen the improvement of Water Safety throughout the country. The AWSC member bodies continue to demonstrate their commitment to Water Safety by directing resources of their respective organisations towards the development and implementation of the Australian Water Safety Strategy.

The current conveynor of the council is Justin Scarr, who is also the CEO of the Royal Life Saving Society Australia.

== Membership ==
- Royal Life Saving Society Australia (RLSSA)
- Surf Life Saving Australia (SLSA)
- AUSTSWIM
- Australian National Sportfishing Association
- Swimming Australia
- Divers Alert Network Asia-Pacific (DAN)
- Kidsafe Australia
- Farmsafe Australia
- National Marine Safety Committee
- Surfing Australia
- Aquatic and Recreation Institute (ARI)
- Australian Swimming Coaches and Teachers Association (ASCTA)
- Australian Local Government Association (ALGA)
- Standing Committee on Recreation and Sport (SCORS)
