= List of Australian surf lifesaving clubs =

Australia has over 300 surf lifesaving clubs affiliated with Surf Life Saving Australia. Notable clubs include:

- Bondi Surf Bathers' Life Saving Club
- Bronte Surf Lifesaving Club
- Cabarita Beach Surf Life Saving Club
- Carrum Surf Life Saving Club
- Clovelly Surf Life Saving Club
- Coogee Surf Life Saving Club
- Cronulla Surf Life Saving Club
- Darwin Surf Life Saving Club
- Dee Why Surf Lifesaving Club
- Elouera Surf Life Saving Club
- Fairhaven Surf Life Saving Club
- Freshwater Surf Life Saving Club
- Ithaca–Caloundra City Life Saving Club
- Southport Surf Lifesaving Club
- Manly Life Saving Club
- Maroubra Surf Life Saving Club
- North Bondi Surf Life Saving Club
- North Cottesloe Surf Life Saving Club
- North Cronulla Surf Life Saving Club
- North Styne Surf Lifesaving Club
- Palm Beach Surf Life Saving Club
- Redhead Surf Lifesaving Club
- South Curl Curl Surf Lifesaving Club
- South Maroubra Surf Life Saving Club
- South Narrabeen Surf Life Saving Club
- South Port SLSC
- Tamarama Surf Life Saving Club
- Wanda Surf Life Saving Club

== See also ==
- List of swim clubs
