= North Cronulla Beach =

Beach in New South Wales, Australia

- Beach
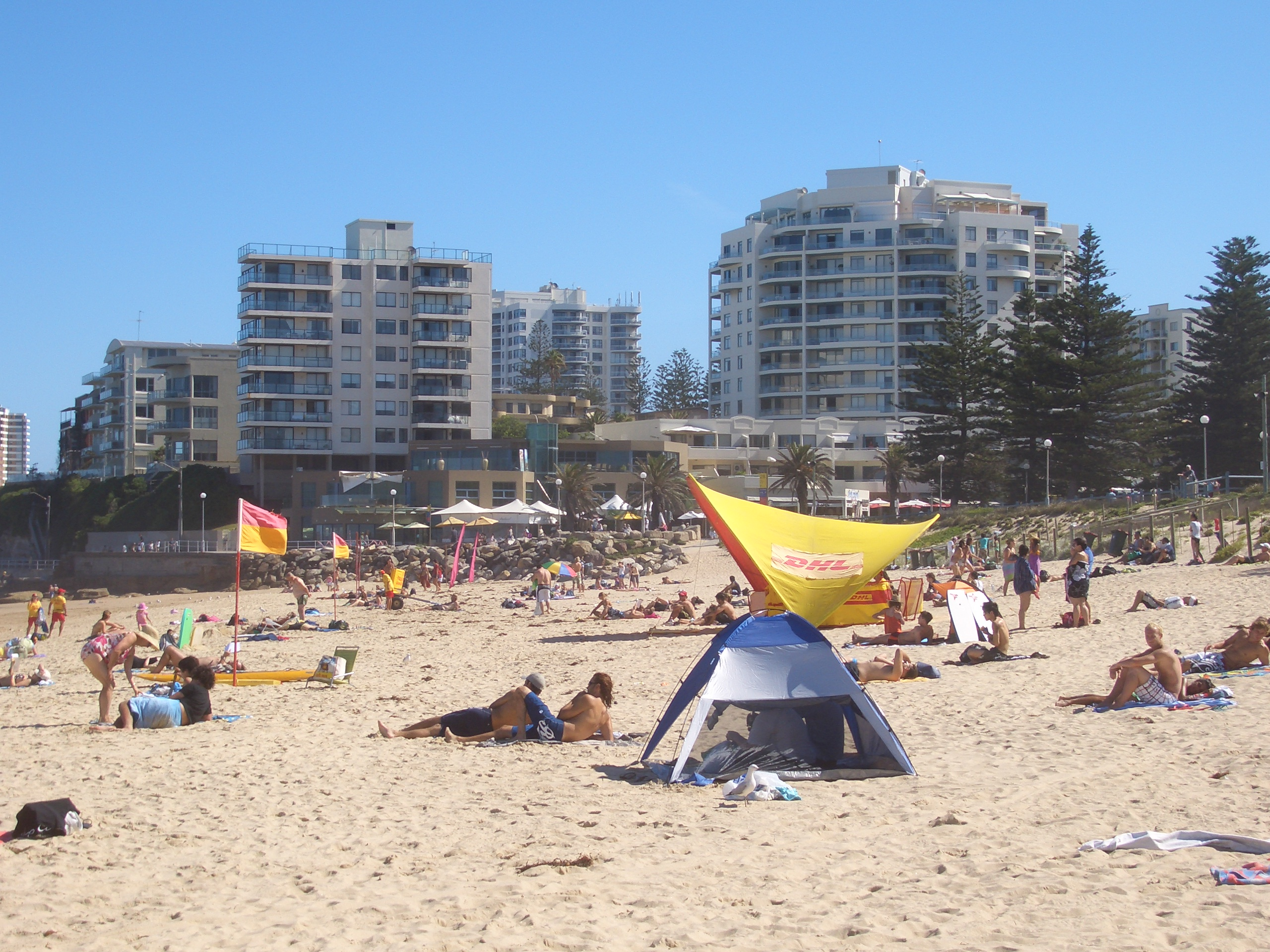
- View of North Cronulla looking south
- Interactive map of North Cronulla Beach
- Coordinates: 34°03′04″S 151°09′22″E
- Location: Cronulla, Sydney, New South Wales, Australia

Dimensions
  - Length: 300 m (980 ft)
- Patrolled by: North Cronulla Surf Life Saving Club
- Hazard rating: 7/10 (highly hazardous)
- Access: T4 Cronulla (train)

North Cronulla Beach or North Cronulla is a patrolled beach on Bate Bay, in Cronulla, Sydney New South Wales, Australia. The Wall is the local name given to the area between North Cronulla Beach and Elouera. The Alley is the local name given to the permanent rip current located at the southern end of North Cronulla Beach.

== North Cronulla Surf Life Saving Club ==
North Cronulla
- Full name: North Cronulla Surf Life Saving Club
- Founded: 1925; 101 years ago
- Colors: Ultramarine Blue Yellow
- Members: 500 senior, 250 junior
- Website: northcronullaslsc.com.au

Uniforms

The North Cronulla Surf Life Saving Club was established by a group of local residents who were concerned about the safety of visitors to the beach. The first patrol of the beach was in 1925, using the reel, line and belt as their only form of rescue equipment. The first clubhouse, which opened in 1926, was a small weatherboard building on the beach, at the end of The Kingsway.

Wave action forced club members to move the clubhouse from the beach into Dunningham Park in 1932. The rock pools between Cronulla and North Cronulla were built and opened the same year. A new, three storey cement rendered clubhouse was opened in 1937, said to be the finest in Australia. The Army’s beach fortifications during World War II affected the seawall foundations and the clubhouse had to be demolished after heavy seas in 1946.

In 1950, North Cronulla lost one of its greatest swimming champions, Club Captain Major James 'Jim' Perryman who was attempting to rescue a 16-year-old woman from the surf when he was pulled under by the weight of seaweed on his rescue line. The woman was pulled to safety by another club member but Perryman, who was reeled to shore, could not be revived. A new clubhouse opened later that year and a pool later added to the surf club complex was named after Perryman.

In 75 years, North Cronulla members conducted more than 11,000 rescues. Today, North Cronulla has approximately 500 senior and 250 junior members.

== History ==
Cronulla is derived from an Aboriginal word kurranulla, meaning 'place of pink seashells'.

After a period of stormy weather eroded the beachfront posing threat to the properties and infrastructure, sea walls were constructed on either side of North Cronulla beach in 1974.

In December 2005 areas around the beach were sites where the Cronulla riots occurred.

== North Cronulla Gallery ==
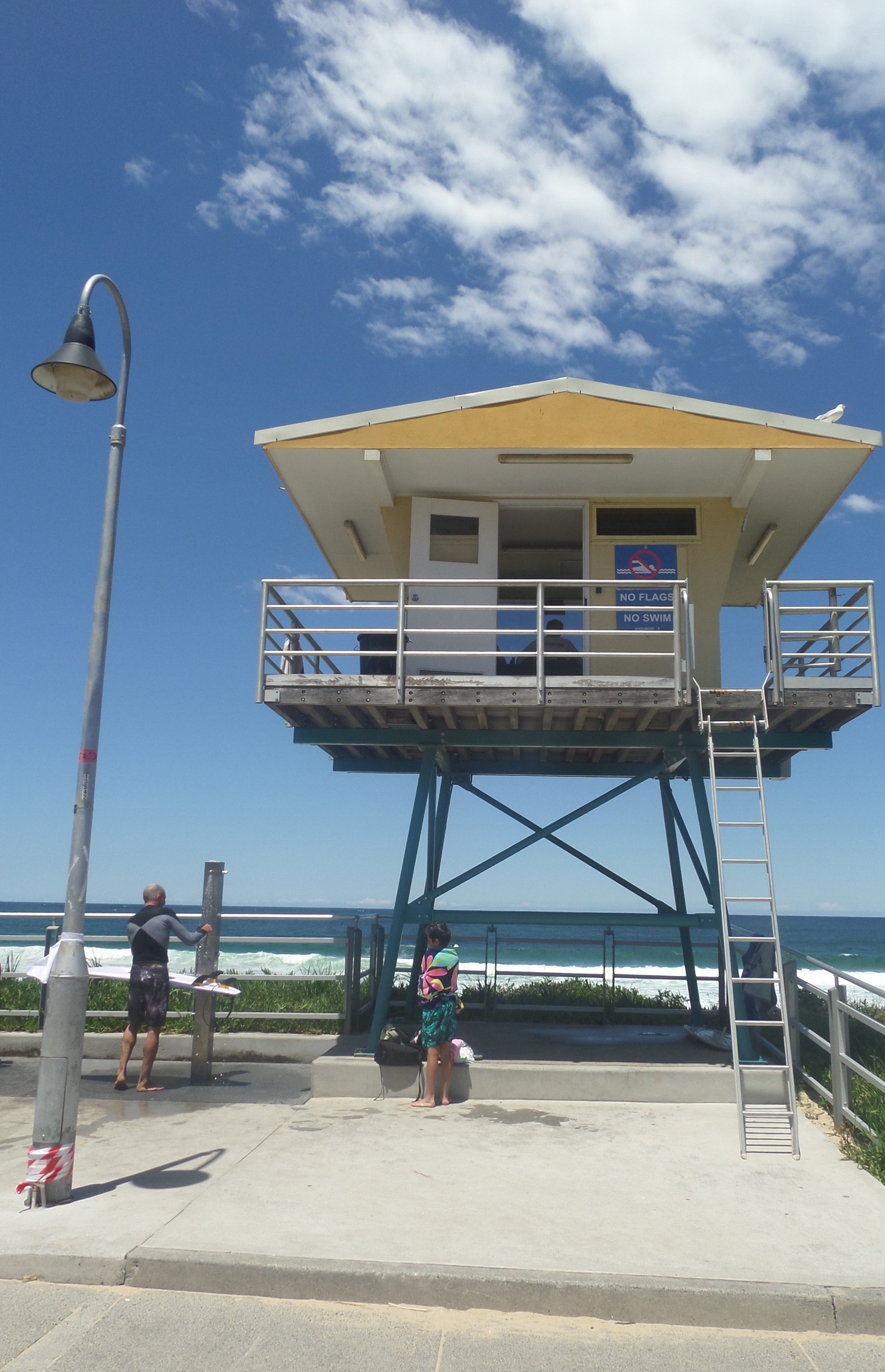
North Cronulla Tower

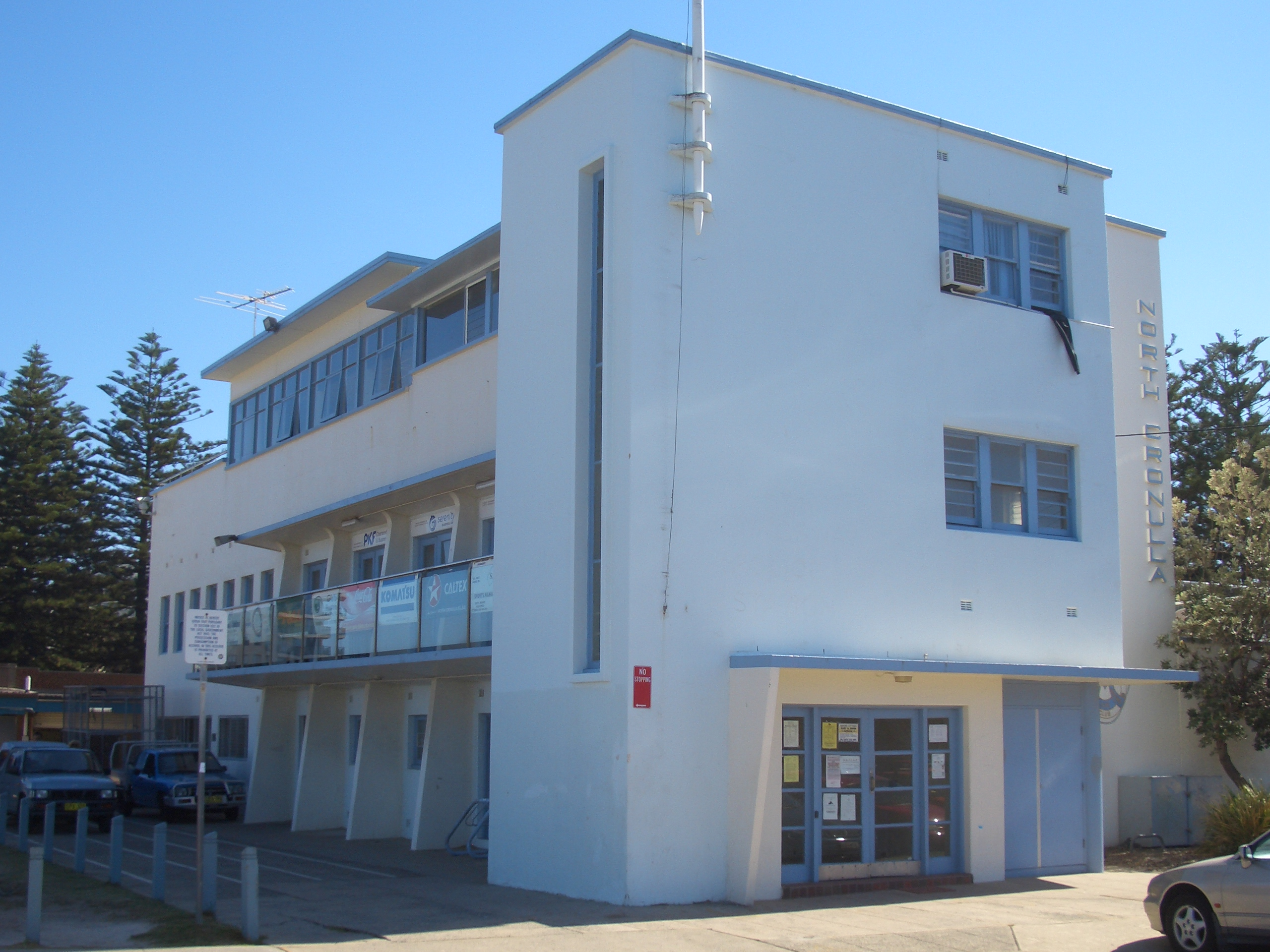
North Cronulla Lifesavers Club

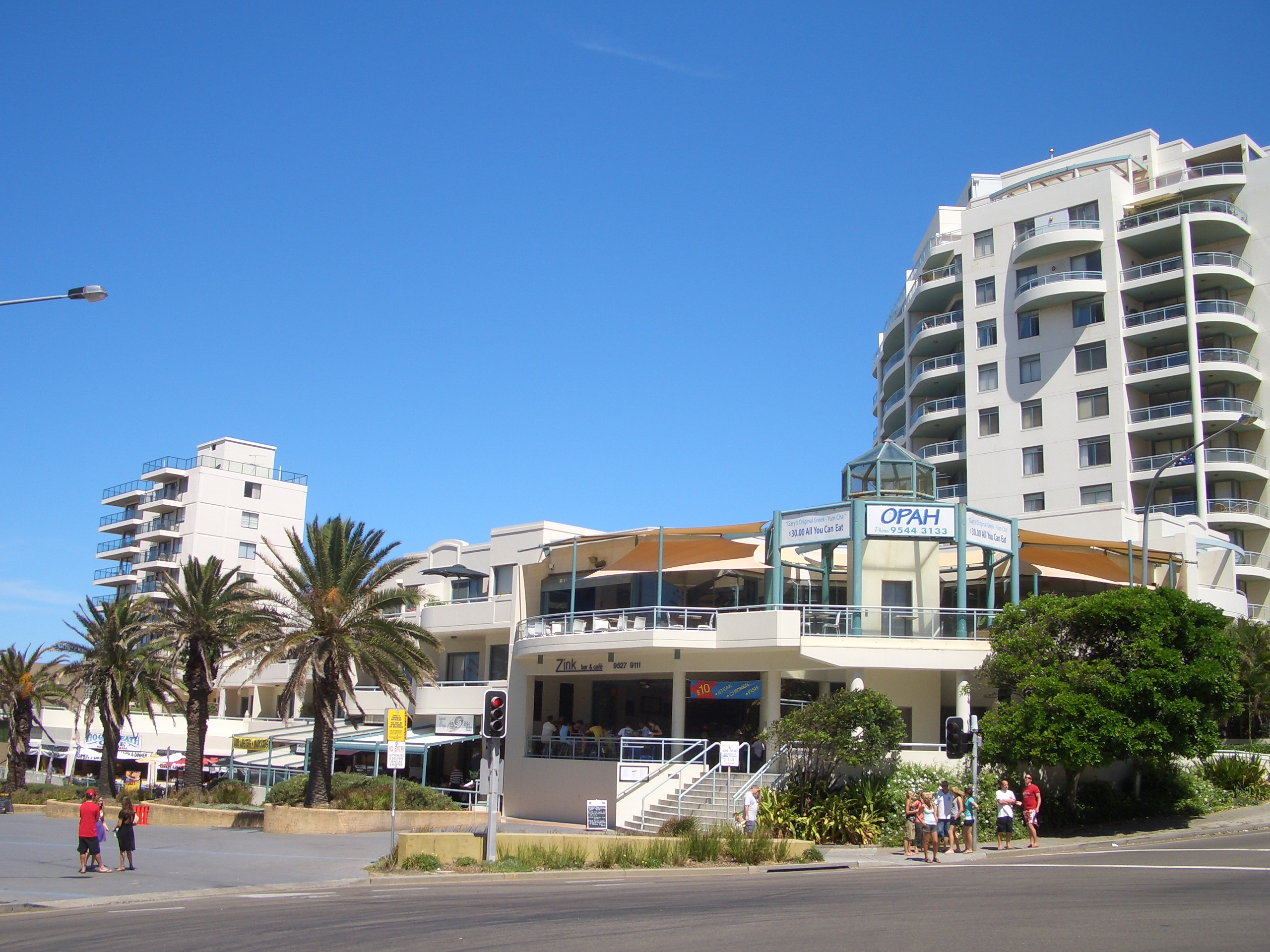
North Cronulla Cafes

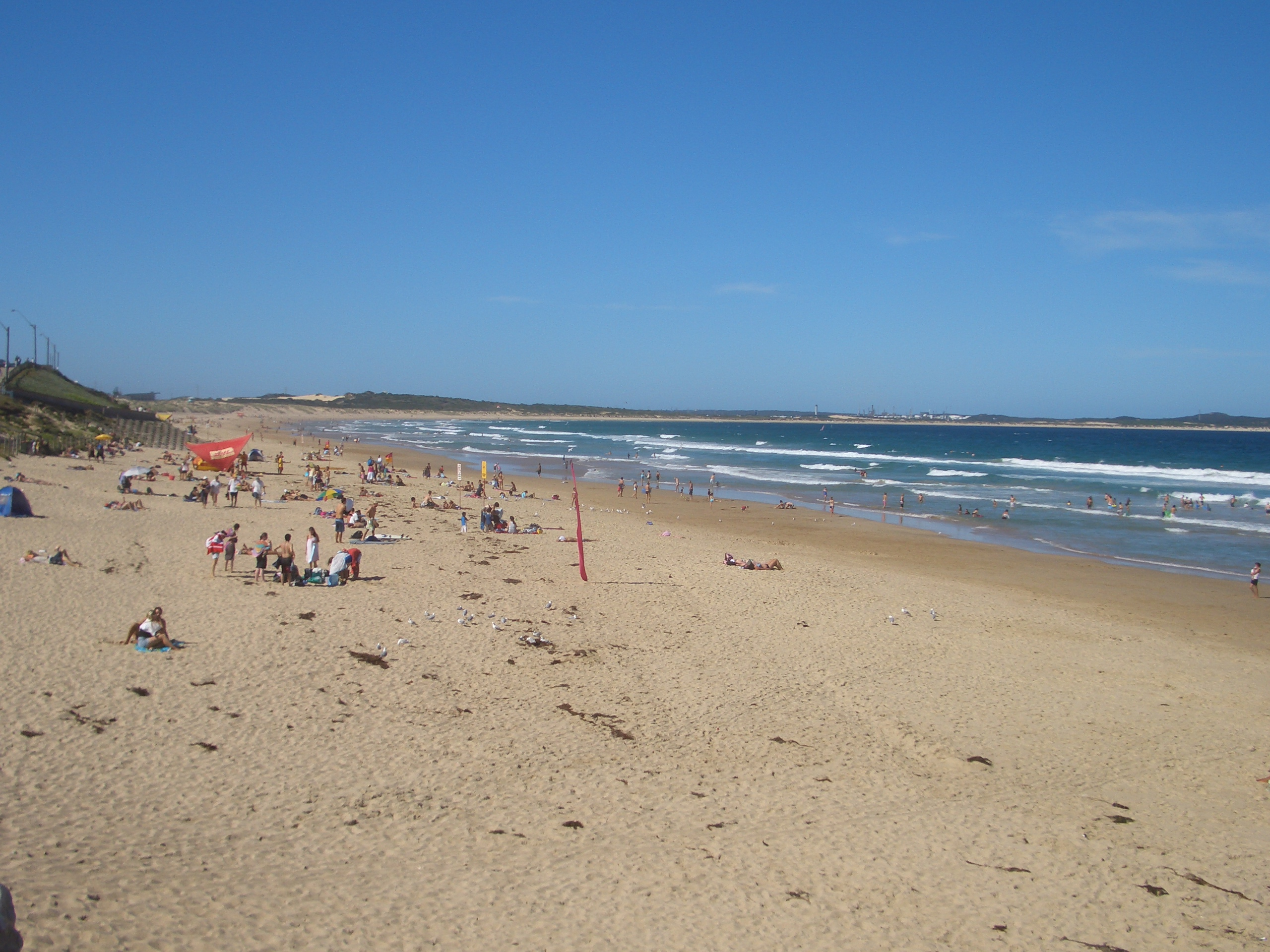
North Cronulla Beach

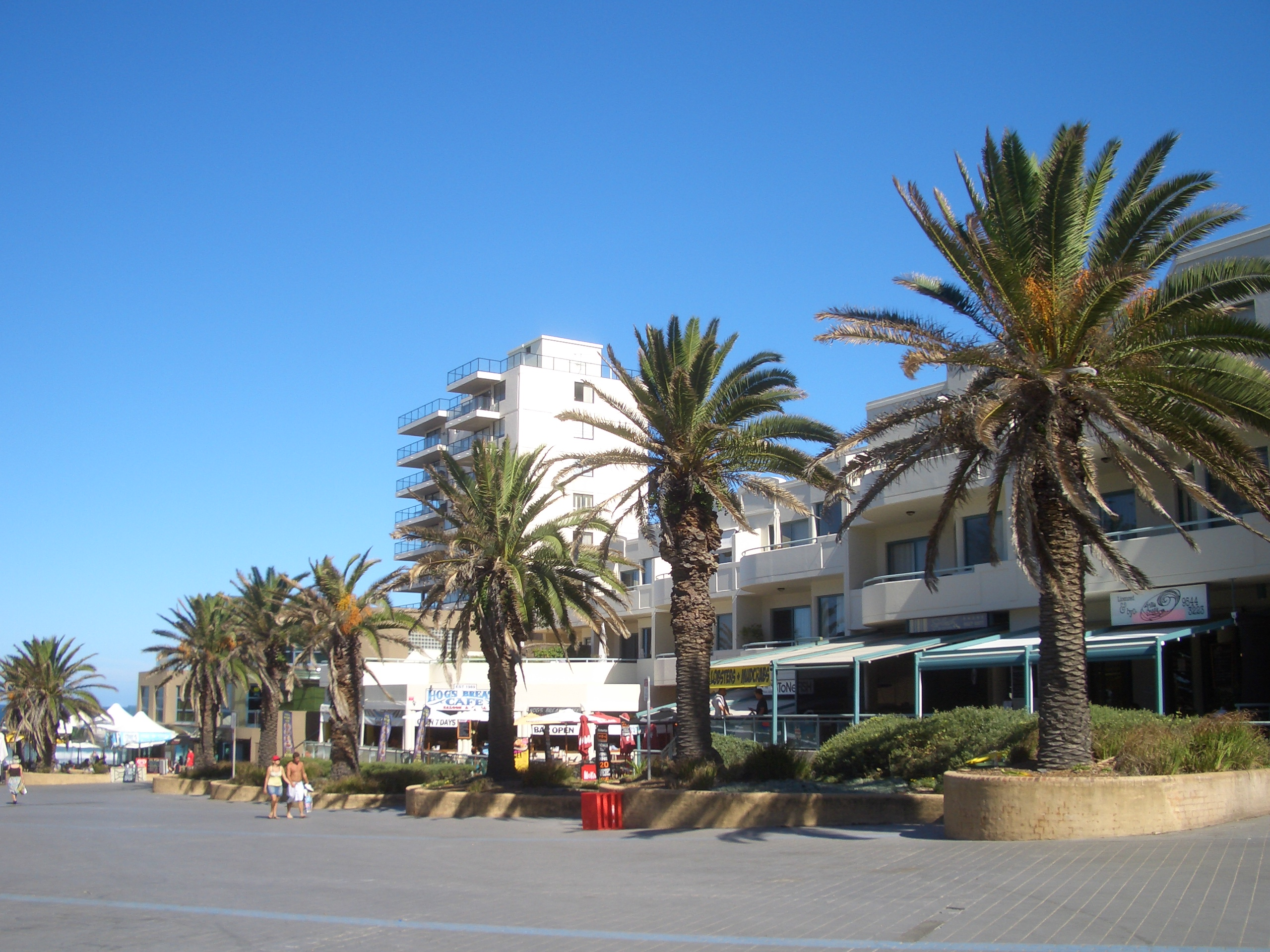
North Cronulla Cafes

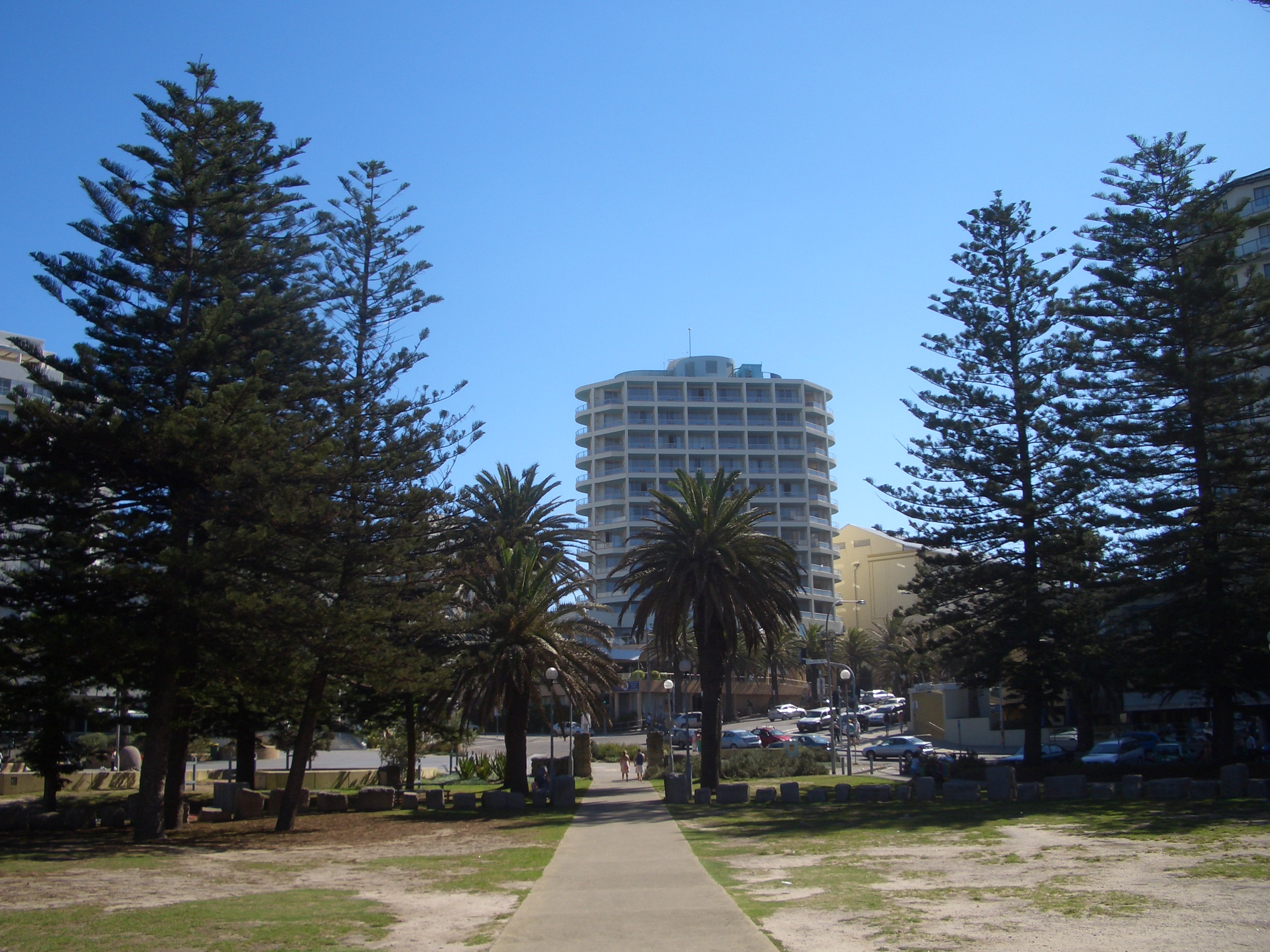
Dunningham Park

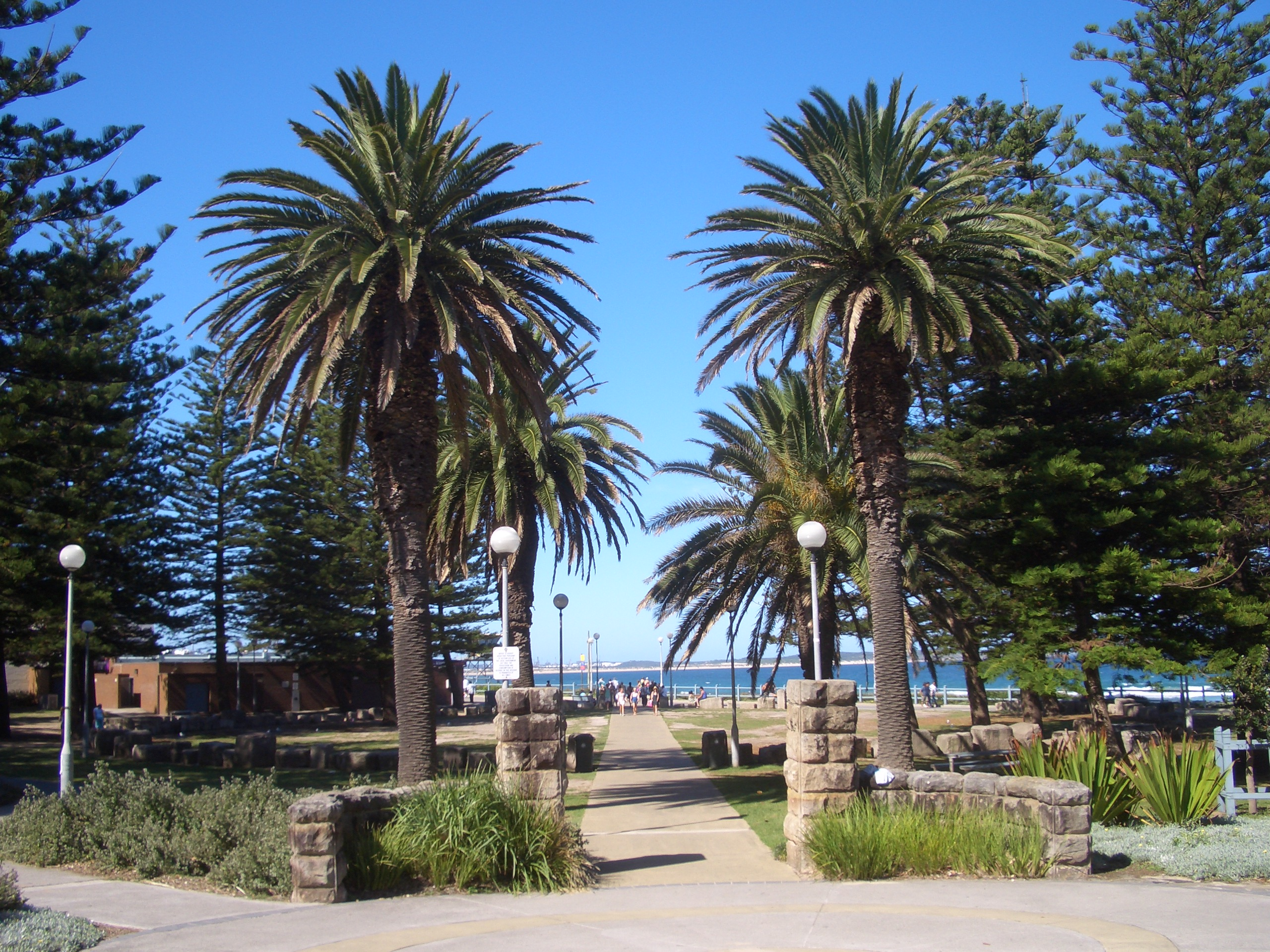
Dunningham Park

== See also ==
- Beaches in Sydney
- Wanda Sand dunes
