= Surf Life Saving Australia =

Water safety nonprofit

- Abbreviation: SLSA
- Formation: 18 October 1907 (119 years ago)
- Headquarters: Bondi Beach, Sydney
- Region served: Australia
- Members: 181,603
- President: Peter Agnew ESM
- Key people: Adam Weir (CEO)
- Subsidiaries: Westpac Life Saver Rescue Helicopter Service
- Affiliations: Australian Water Safety Council; International Life Saving Federation
- Staff: 43 (2017)
- Website: sls.com.au
- Formerly called: Surf Life Saving Association of Australia

Surf Life Saving Australia (SLSA) is an Australian not-for-profit community organisation that promotes water safety and provides surf rescue services.

SLSA strives to create a safe environment on Australia's beaches and coastline through patrols, education and training, public safety campaigns and the promotion of health and fitness. As of 30 June 2020 the organisation had 181,603 members with 314 affiliated surf life saving clubs. The majority of its services are provided by volunteer surf lifesavers, that provided 1.26 million hours of service, rescued 7,731 people, performed 1,609,184 preventative actions and provided 68,766 first aid treatments during 2019/20. In 1973, the organisation established the Westpac Life Saver Rescue Helicopter Service that, during 2016/17, delivered 850 rescue missions via helicopter.

Surf Life Saving Australia also operates Australia's largest lifeguard service, contracting to local government and other coastal land managers. Additional income is sourced through community donations, fundraising and corporate sponsorship. SLSA is a foundation member of the International Life Saving Federation (ILS).

== History ==
In 1902 it was against the law to enter the ocean during daylight hours in Australia . A Sydney newspaper editor William Gocher announced his challenge of this law at Manly Beach however it is unclear this act changed the rules. What did occur is that 10 days after an incident at Bondi on 13 November 1902, Randwick Council became the first to allow daylight bathing. Eventually as more people began to challenge the law it was reversed but inexperienced swimmers were having problems with unusual surf conditions such as rip currents and the number of drownings increased. Groups of volunteers began to patrol the beach to assist and on 21 February 1907 the Bondi Surf Bathers' Life Saving Club was formed. The Surf Bathing Association of New South Wales was formed on 18 October 1907 when nine voluntary surf life saving clubs and representatives of the Royal Life Saving Society (RLSS) met and affiliated to represent the interests of surf lifesavers. In attendance were the Royal Life Saving Society, Manly Surf Club (this a different organisation to the Manly Life Saving Club which was formed in 1911), Bondi Surf Bathers' Life Saving Club, Coogee Surf Life Brigade, Bronte Surf Brigade, Bondi Surf and Social Club (North Bondi SLSC), Tamarama Surf Club (only lasted a few weeks/months and then collapsed), Maroubra Surf Club, United Wanderers Surf Club and Woollahra Surf Club. The meeting resolved:

"That it is desirable to form an association of surf clubs, to secure improved facilities for surf bathing, and otherwise promote and regulate the sport..." and "That the association be called 'The Surf Bathing Association of N.S.W."

The name was changed to Surf Life Saving Association of Australia (SLSAA) in 1922; and changed again in 1991 to the current Surf Life Saving Australia.

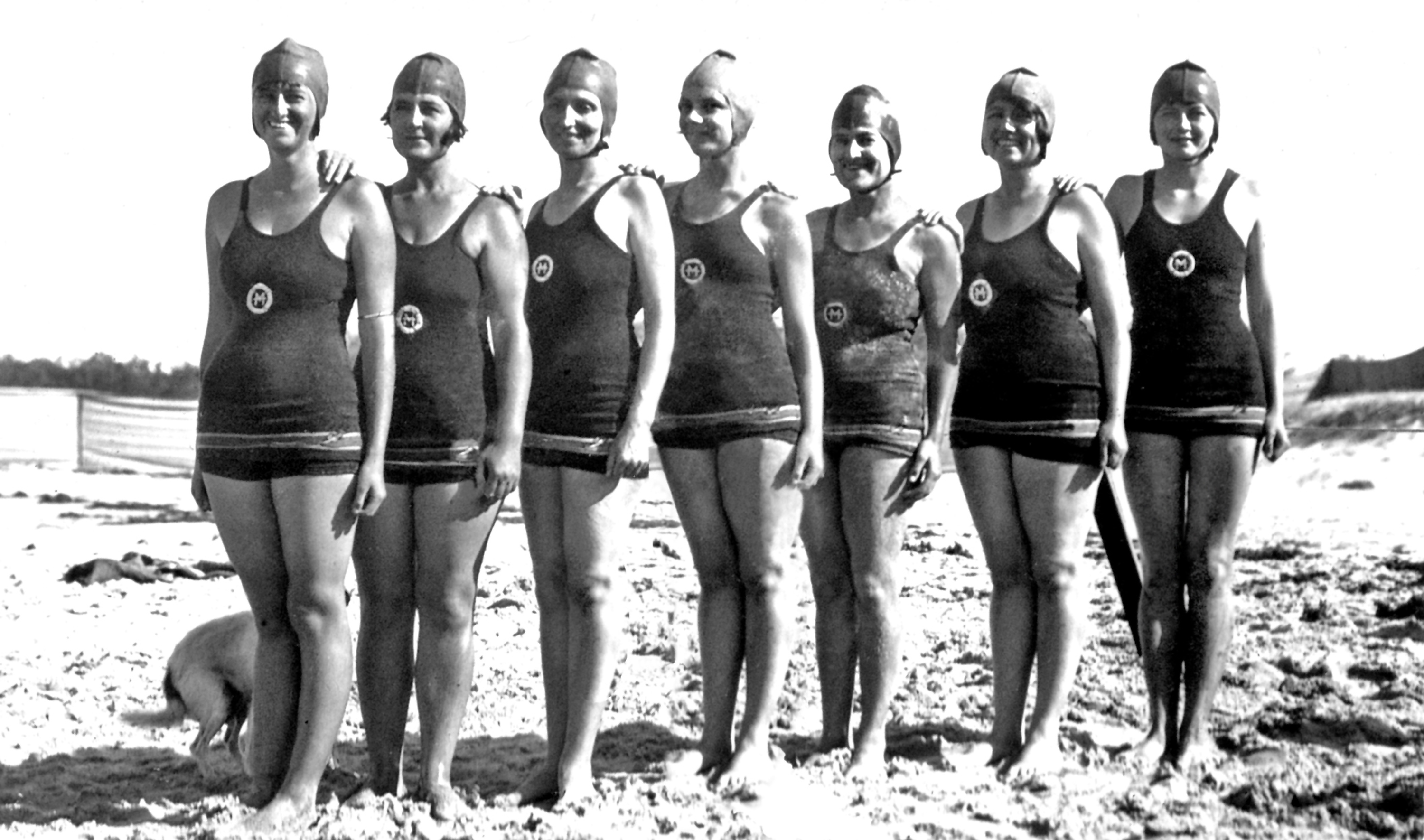
Women's life saving squad, Mooloolaba, Queensland, 1931

In 1928, a group of Brisbane women who trained at the Ithaca Baths formed the Neptune Ladies Life Saving Club, the first women's club in Australia. As it was believed that women were not strong enough to perform rescues in the surf, the role of women life savers was restricted to swimming pools and still water and to conduct training. Nonetheless, women's clubs participated non-competitively in surf-lifesaving carnivals for many years. In 1959, the Neptune Club commenced regular weekend patrols of the waters of Tallebudgera Creek, a popular swimming area on the Gold Coast. The patrol of 10 women would camp in the foreshore in tents. In 1960, the Queensland Government donated some land to build a clubhouse, which was built in 1961 following local fundraising. They were the first female club to establish a regular patrol and to establish a clubhouse. In 1980, the rules were changed, so that women could become active patrolling members of the SLSA on all beaches. Neptune Club members were among the first women to obtain the surf bronze medallion (required for surf rescues). As men's life saving clubs began to open to women members, the Neptune Club opened to men and is now called the Neptune Royal Life Saving Club and continues to patrol Tallebudgera Creek. Forty years later in 2020, SLSA had 79,775 female members of all ages and in all roles across 314 surf clubs, making up 45% of the membership.

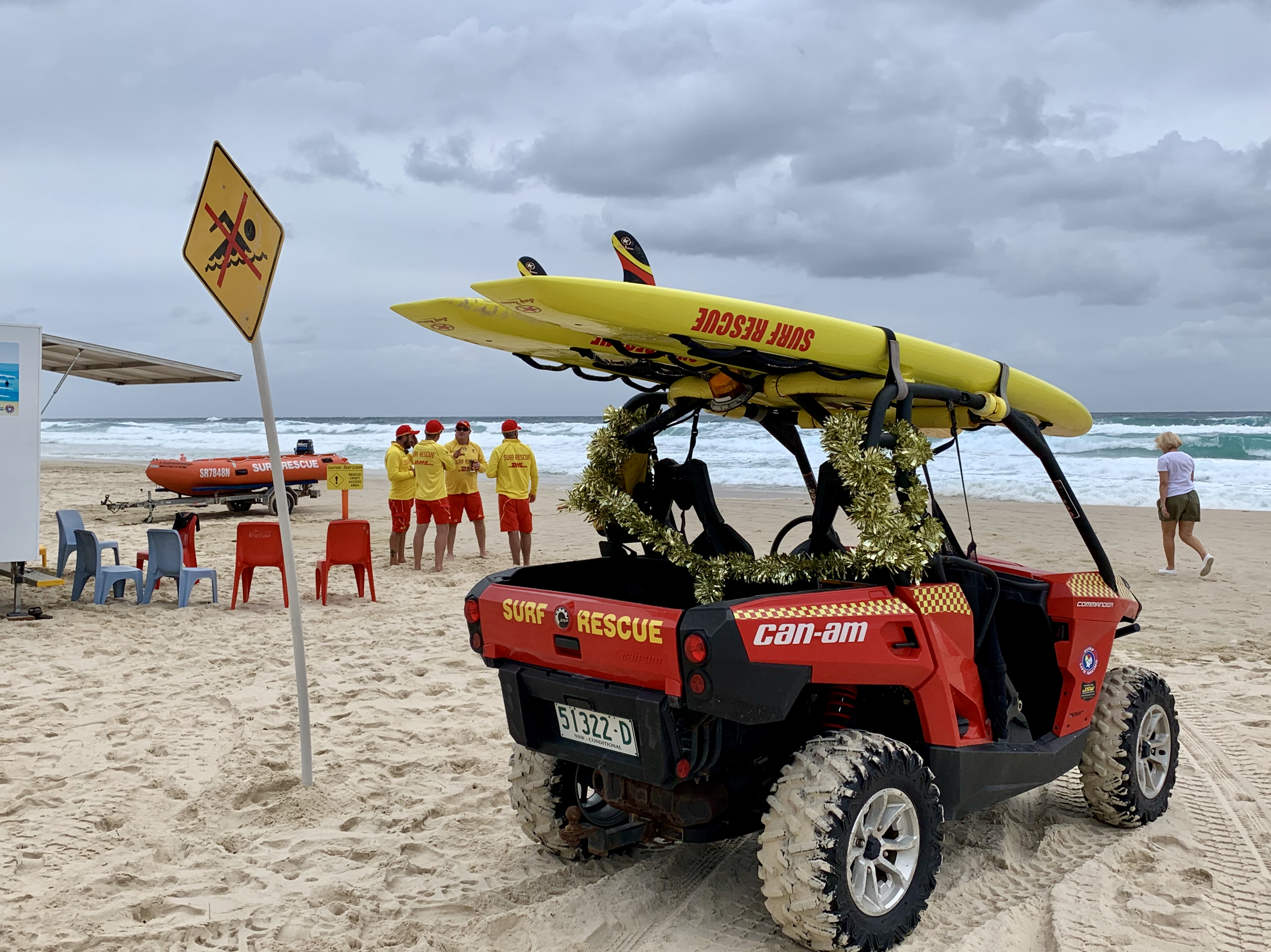
A surf life saving buggy at Kingscliff

== Surf life saving ==
SLSA's vision is zero preventable drowning deaths in Australian waters, and is worked towards through patrolling beaches, coastal risk assessments, education, and training. Since 1907, surf lifesavers have rescued over 650,000 beachgoers. In 2017–18, surf lifesavers and Australian Lifeguard Service (ALS) Lifeguards performed 10,249 rescues, 65,296 first aid treatments, and over 1.5 million preventative actions on Australia's beaches.

== States and branches: Geographical areas and divisions ==
- Life Saving Victoria
  - Gippsland, largely within the Shire of East Gippsland
  - Bass area
  - Geelong area, including the Bellarine Peninsula:
    - Bancoora Surf Life Saving Club (SLSC)
    - Barwon Heads / Thirteenth Beach SLSC
    - Ocean Grove SLSC
    - Point Lonsdale SLSC
  - Port Phillip area, incorporating parts of the City of Port Phillip and the Cities of Melbourne and Hobsons Bay:
    - Altona Lifesaving Club (LSC)
    - Elwood LSC
    - Port Melbourne LSC
    - Sandridge LSC
    - South Melbourne LSC
    - St Kilda LSC
    - Williamstown Swimming and Life Saving Club
  - Kingston area
  - Bayside area
  - Peninsula area (Mornington Peninsula)
  - Surf Coast area
  - Otway area (Otway Coast and Colac Otway Shire):
    - Apollo Bay SLSC
    - Kennett River SLSC
    - Wye River SLSC
  - Western area:
    - Mildura LSC
    - Port Campbell SLSC
    - Port Fairy SLSC
    - Portland SLSC
    - Warrnambool SLSC
- Surf Lifesaving NSW
  - Far North Coast
  - North Coast
  - Mid North Coast
  - Lower North Coast (the most-southerly areas of the Mid North Coast)
  - Hunter
  - Central Coast
  - Sydney Northern Beaches
  - Sydney
  - Illawarra
  - South Coast
  - Far South Coast (the most-southerly areas of the South Coast)
- Surf Lifesaving WA
- Surf Lifesaving SA
- Surf Lifesaving Queensland
  - North Queensland
  - North Barrier
  - Wide Bay - Capricorn Coast
  - Sunshine Coast
  - Brisbane
  - South Coast
  - Point Danger
- Surf Lifesaving Tas
- Surf Lifesaving NT

== Membership ==
As of 30 June 2020, Surf Life Saving has a membership base of 181,603. Nationally there are 72,689 junior members, or Nippers as they are more commonly known. Nippers are aged between 5–13 years and learn beach safety and awareness skills, in a fun and healthy environment.

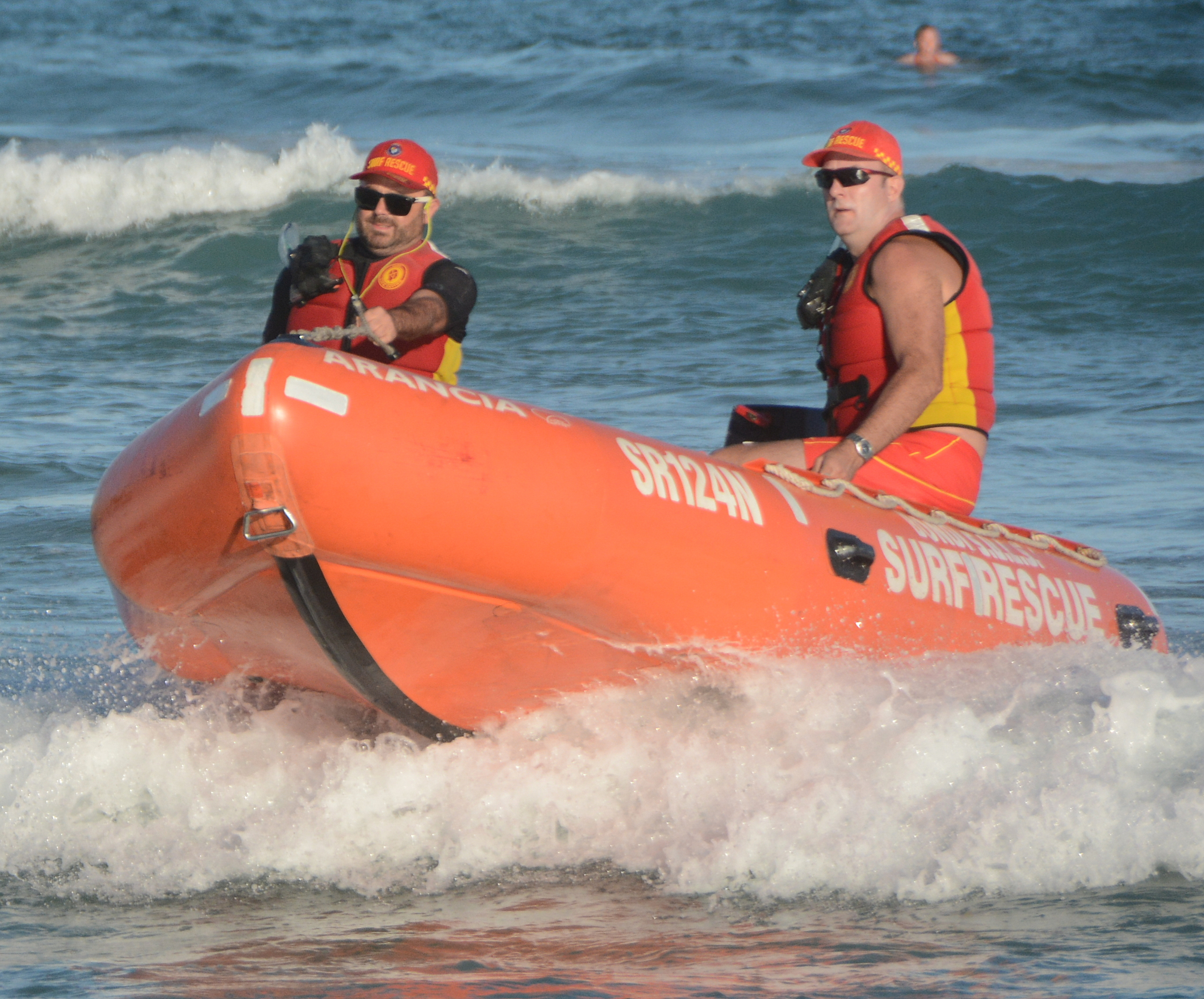
Lifesavers at Bondi Beach

== See also ==
- Royal Life Saving Society Australia
- 1907 Sydney bathing costume protests
- Australian Water Safety Council
- List of Australian surf lifesaving clubs
- Surf Life Saving New Zealand
