= Surf life saving club =

Volunteer institutions in Australia and New Zealand

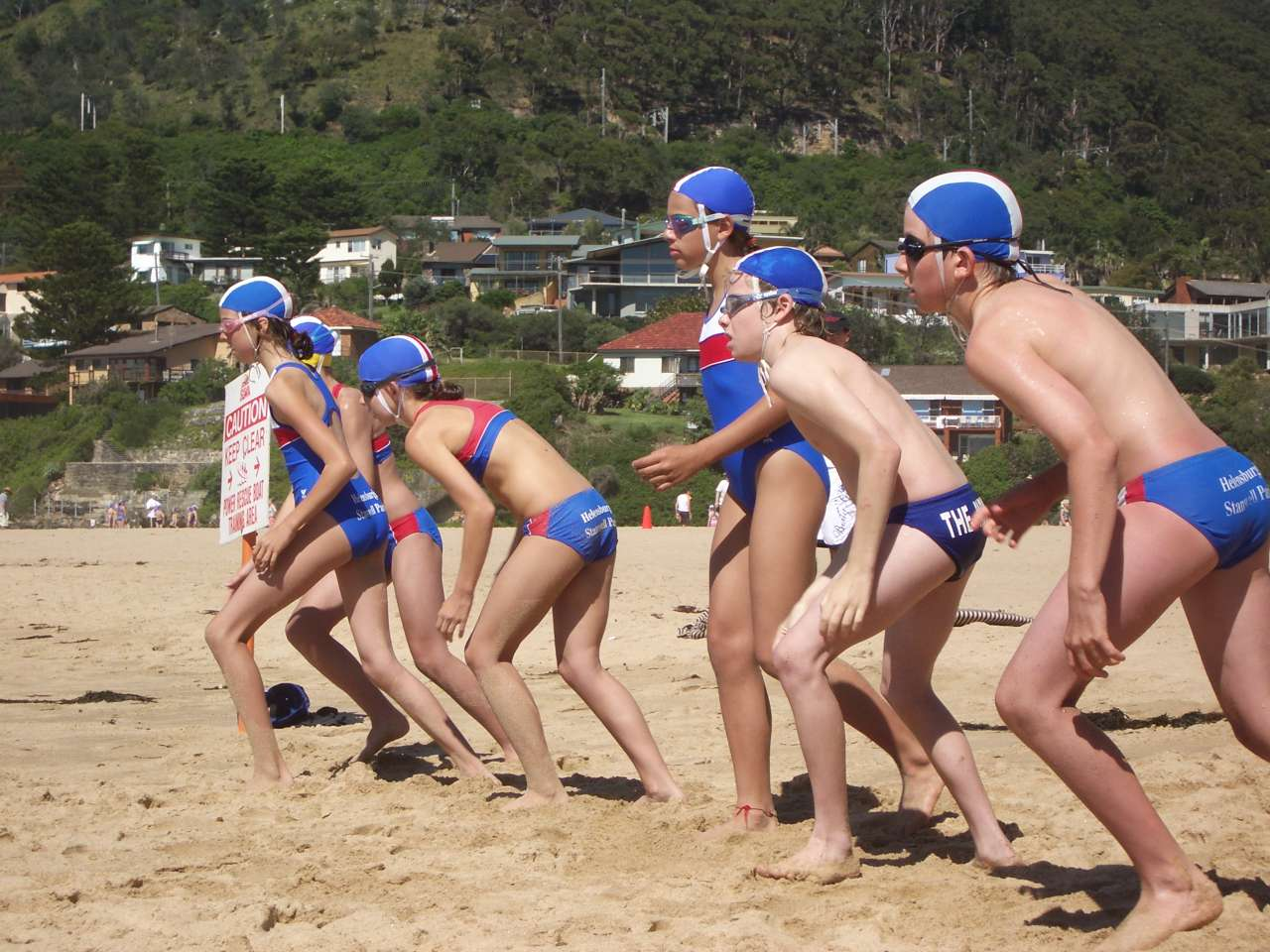
Under-12 aged nippers in start position before their swim in Stanwell Park, dressed in local SLSC uniform

Surf life saving clubs (or SLSCs) are volunteer institutions at Australian and New Zealand beaches. The clubs conduct surf lifesaving services on weekends and public holidays, and in the 2014-2015 season they saved 12,690 people. They also host many beach sport activities, such as Nippers, surf carnivals and other competitions. The SLSCs are responsible for the education of lifesavers including operation of inflatable rescue boats (IRBs) and maintaining radio communication with other beaches and air rescue resources.

== Slang ==
Members are known colloquially as "clubbies".

== See also ==
- Surf Life Saving Australia
- List of Australian surf lifesaving clubs
- Surf Life Saving New Zealand
