= Nippers =

Australian young surf lifesavers

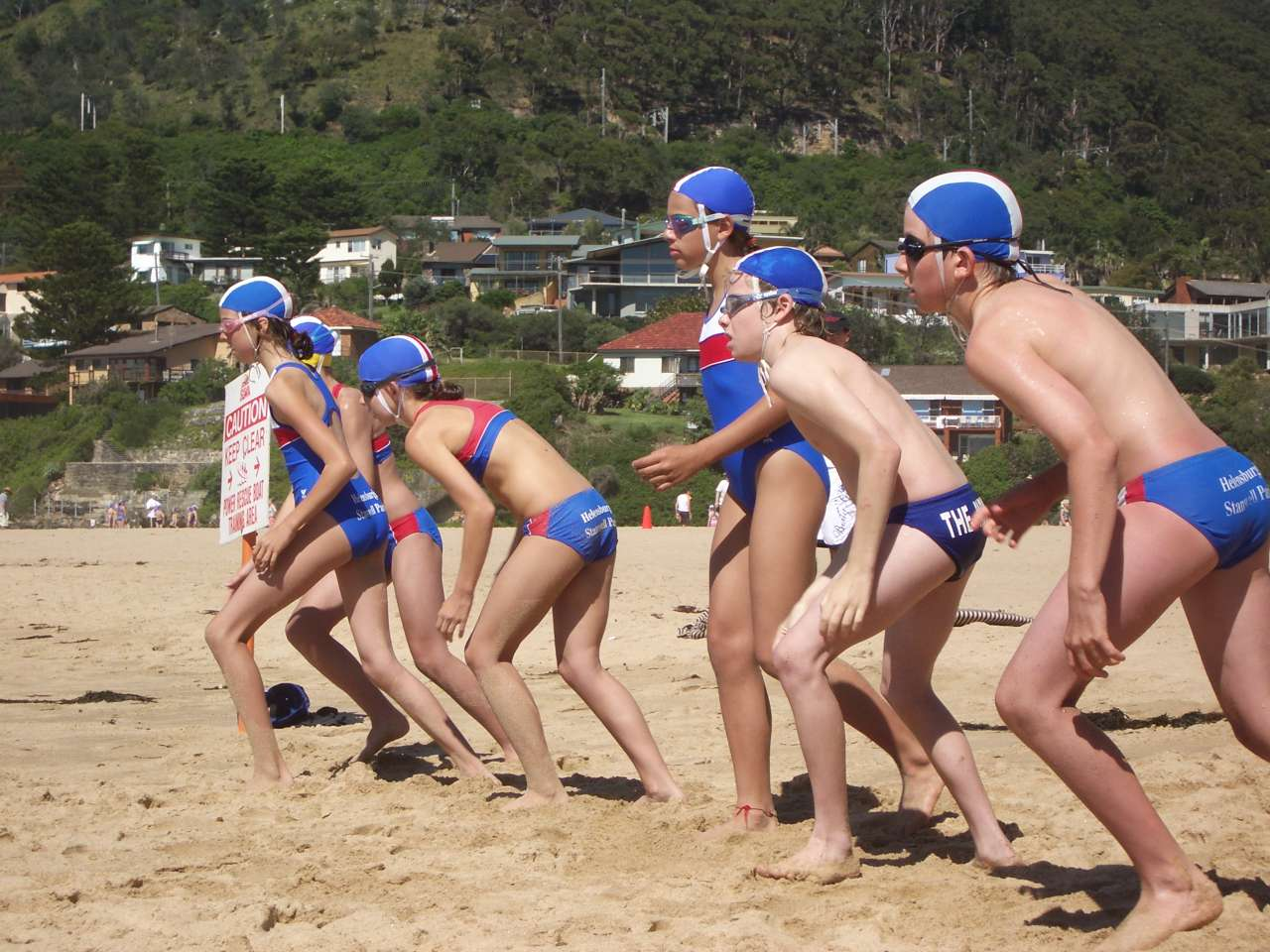
Under-12 aged nippers in start position before their swim in Stanwell Park, dressed in local SLSC uniform.

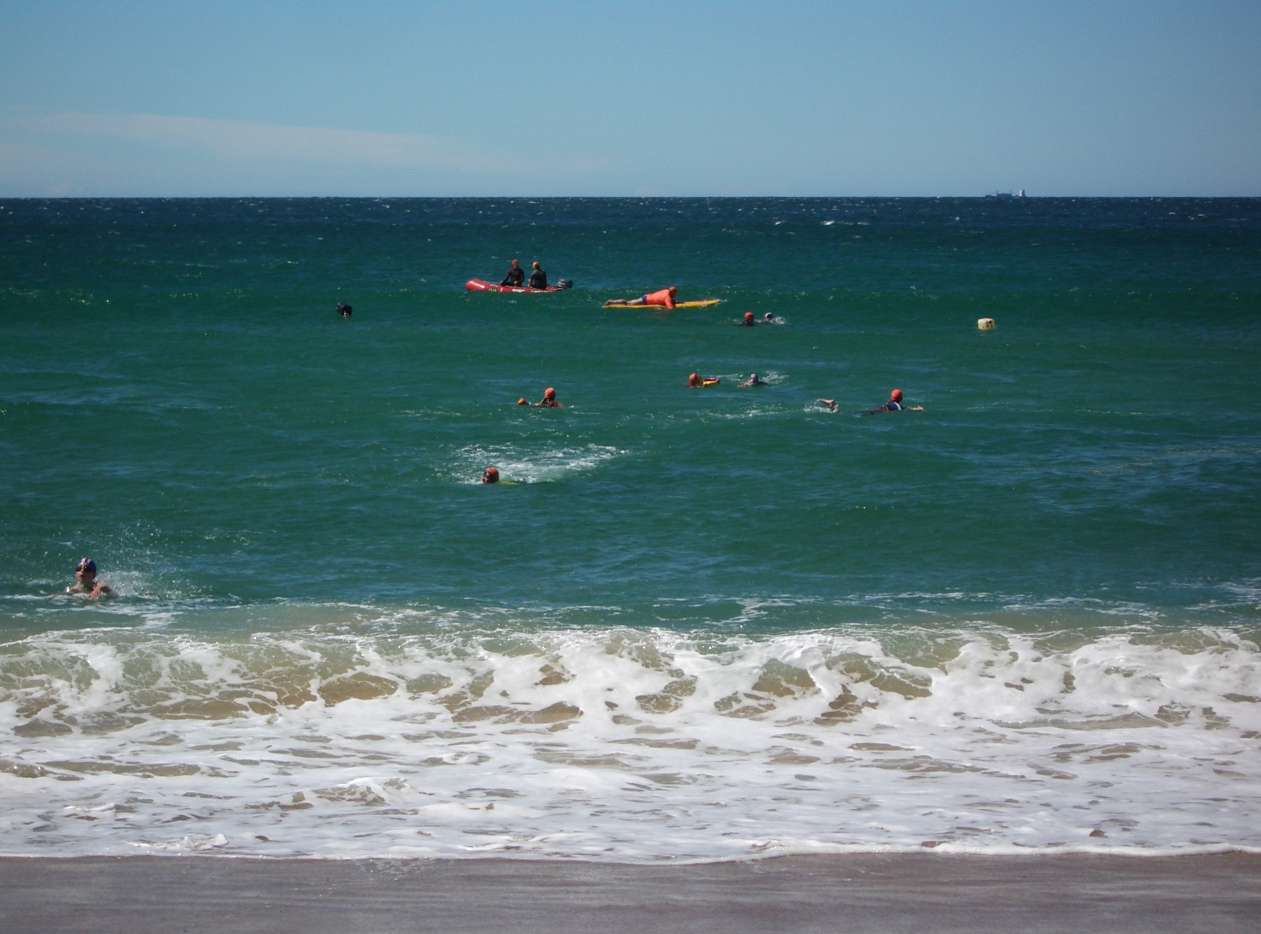
Nippers during their Surf Race competition.

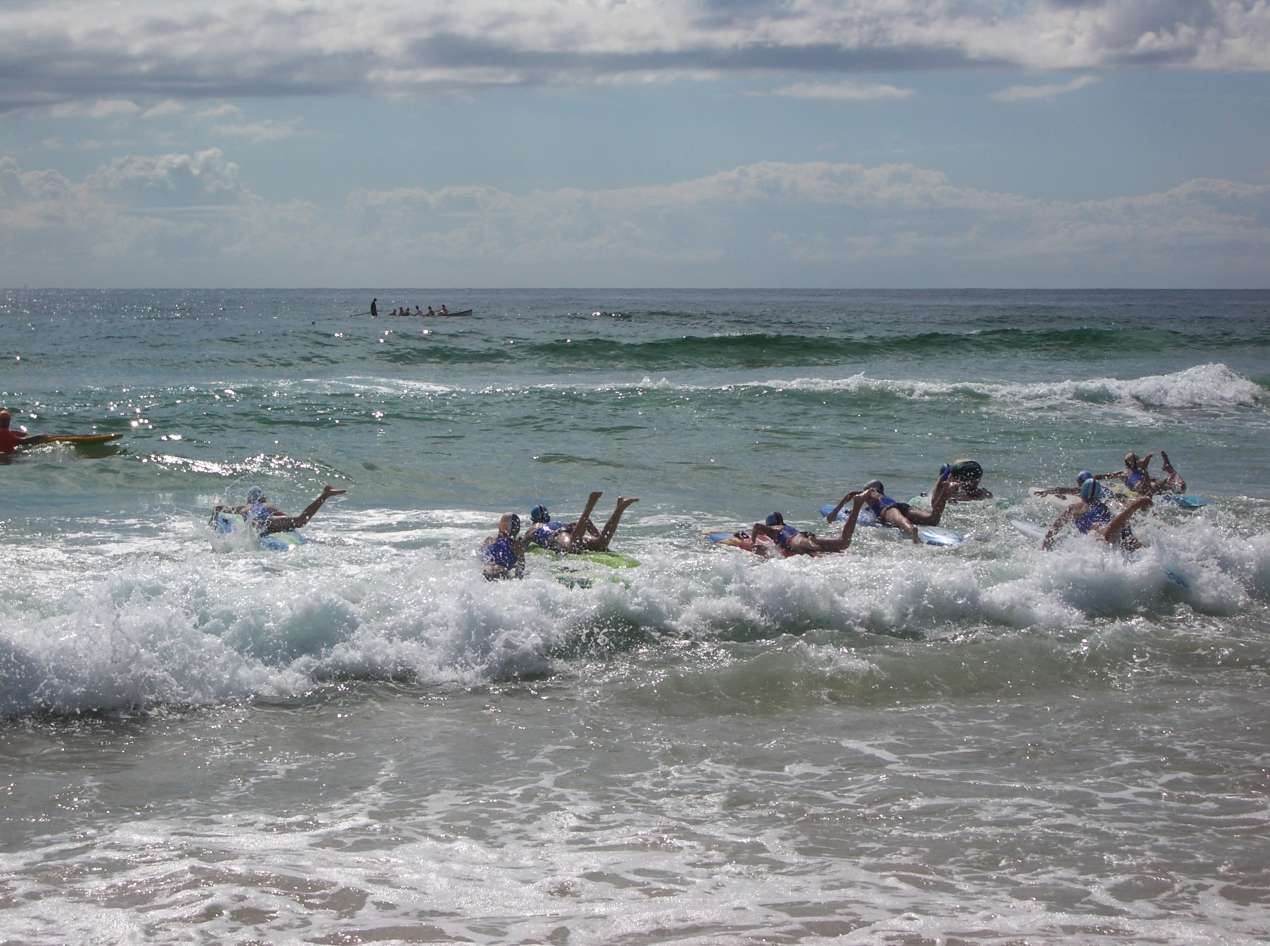
Board Race of the Nippers heading the open sea.

Nippers are young surf lifesavers, usually aged between 5 and 14 years old, in clubs across Australia, New Zealand and South Africa. Unlike senior surf lifesavers, the majority of them do not patrol the beaches. The focus for Nippers tends to be on fun, and surf awareness.

Nippers learn about safety at the beach. They learn about dangers such as rocks, animals (e.g. the blue-ringed octopus), and surf conditions, such as rip currents, sandbars, and waves. Older Nippers also learn some basic first aid and may also learn CPR when they reach the age of 13.

When Nippers are thirteen years old they can complete their SRC (Surf Rescue Certificate), enabling them to patrol beaches and partake in Senior Competition.

Like their Senior counterparts, Nippers participate in regular competition against other Surf Lifesaving Clubs, at sports carnivals. Nippers are able to participate in a variety of Individual and Team events, including beach sprints, Beach Flags, swimming and board races, relays, March Past, etc. Unlike Seniors, Nippers do not compete in surf ski or surfboat races, and they also use shorter surfboards than their Senior counterparts. Nippers start to compete when they are in the Under 8s age group. Boy nippers, unlike lifeguards who mostly wear board shorts, wear tight fit trunks or briefs.

The name and availability of the preschool-age group varies from club to club. These groups, sometimes called Tiny Tots or "Beach Worms", do not compete or learn first aid and surf awareness. Tiny Tots' activities include games, wading and paddling.

== Australia ==
The first Nippers club in Australia was started by Nambucca Heads Surf Life Saving Club, on the New South Wales mid-north coast, in 1961.
