= Mackenzies Bay =

Bight in Sydney, Australia

- Bight
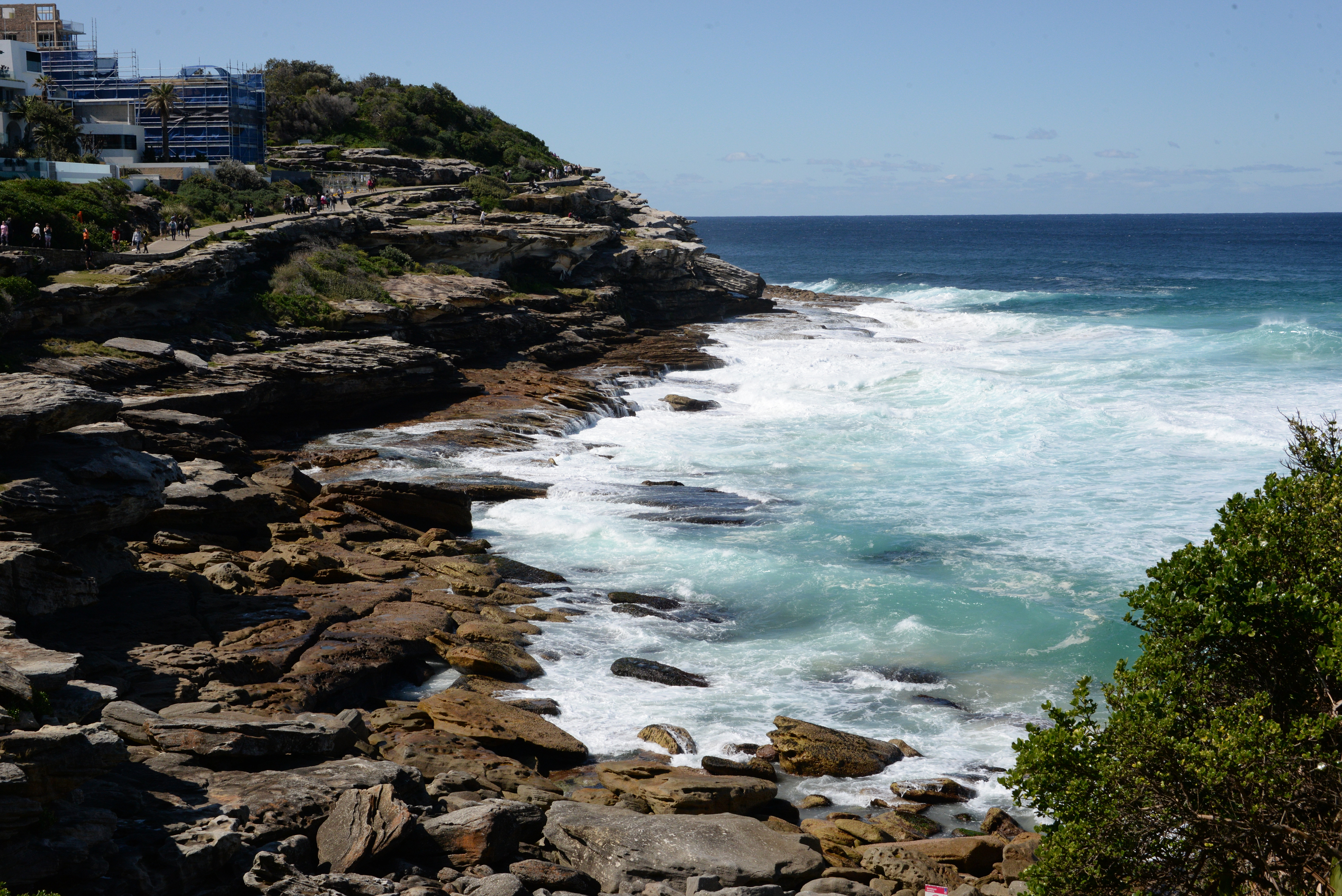
- View of Mackenzies Bay, looking north-east

- Coordinates: 33°53′59″S 151°16′23″E
- Location: Eastern Suburbs, New South Wales, Australia
- Offshore water bodies: Tasman Sea

Mackenzies Bay is a small embayment in the coast between Bondi Beach and Tamarama Beach in the Eastern Suburbs of Sydney, New South Wales. It forms part of the shoreline boundary of the suburb of Tamarama. Most of the time, it is a rocky inlet but, at times, depending on prevailing conditions, a sandy beach—known informally as Mackenzies Bay Beach or Mackenzies—comes into existence. Mackenzies Bay is also a well-known surf break.

Because it is not a permanent beach and is not patrolled, whenever it exists, the beach has become, de facto, a 'dog-friendly beach'. It is not regarded as a safe beach for swimmers, due to its narrow dimensions, not being patrolled, and its difficult access over a rocky and slippery shoreline. If large numbers are using the beach, lifesavers are sometimes diverted there, from adjacent beaches, to watch over those using it.

== History of the appearances of the beach ==
In recent years, the beach existed at times during 2007, 2016, 2019, and 2023.

In the years up to 1947, the beach typically appeared around December and then disappeared around March, with the arrival of southerly gales. The beach then did not reappear until near the end of October 1951. The beach next reappeared in November 1953. Locals reportedly claimed that in 1997—an exceptional year—there was so much sand that, at low tide, it was almost possible to walk between Tamarama and South Bondi; however, given the water depth around the rock platforms between those beaches, that claim is questionable.

In the years between 1997 and 2007, there was no beach. Unusually, in 2007, the beach arrived in May and disappeared in August. That was another exceptional year, and the sand on the beach was estimated to be up to 80m wide and up to 20m in depth. In September 2016, December 2019, and late August 2023, the beach followed its more typical pattern and appeared in time for the beginning of the Australian summer. The latest instance of the beach was disappearing by February 2024.

One theory about the occurrence of the beach relates to the number of storms, hence the overall amount of wave energy impacting the coastline, over a particular period. The better the weather, the lower the wave energy, and the more likely it is that the beach will form. That theory is supported by some apparent temporal association, between the formation of the beach and the global weather phenomena known as El Niño. The combination of swell from a low-pressure system and an offshore wind is believed to particularly favourable, sweeping sand from nearby sandbanks so that it accumulates in the bay. Even when a massive amount of sand is present, such as was the case in 1997 and 2007, the beach can disappear very quickly, once weather conditions change.

Timeline of El Niño episodes between 1900 and 2024.

It is thought that there have been at least 30 El Niño events between 1900 and 2024, with the 1982–83, 1997–98 and 2014–16 events among the strongest on record. However, there also seem to have been a few El Niño events during which the existence of a beach seems not to have been recorded, albeit these were generally 'weaker' El Niño events. A local lifeguard has observed that short-lived sand dumps are more frequent than is widely observed, sometimes occurring during winter, when less people frequent the area to see such an event occur.

== Human history ==
The area was occupied by local Aborigines, before their dispossession in the years after Sydney was established in 1788. There is a rock engraving at Mackenzies Point depicting marine life. The age of the engraving is not known, but could be up to 2,000 years old.

Mackenzies Bay and nearby Mackenzies Point are named after the Mackenzie family who, from the 1860s to approximately 1926, ran the Waverley Dairy on farmlands that stretched from near the corner of Bondi Road and Denham Street, east to the coast, and as far south as Gaerloch Avenue, Tamarama.

== Gallery ==
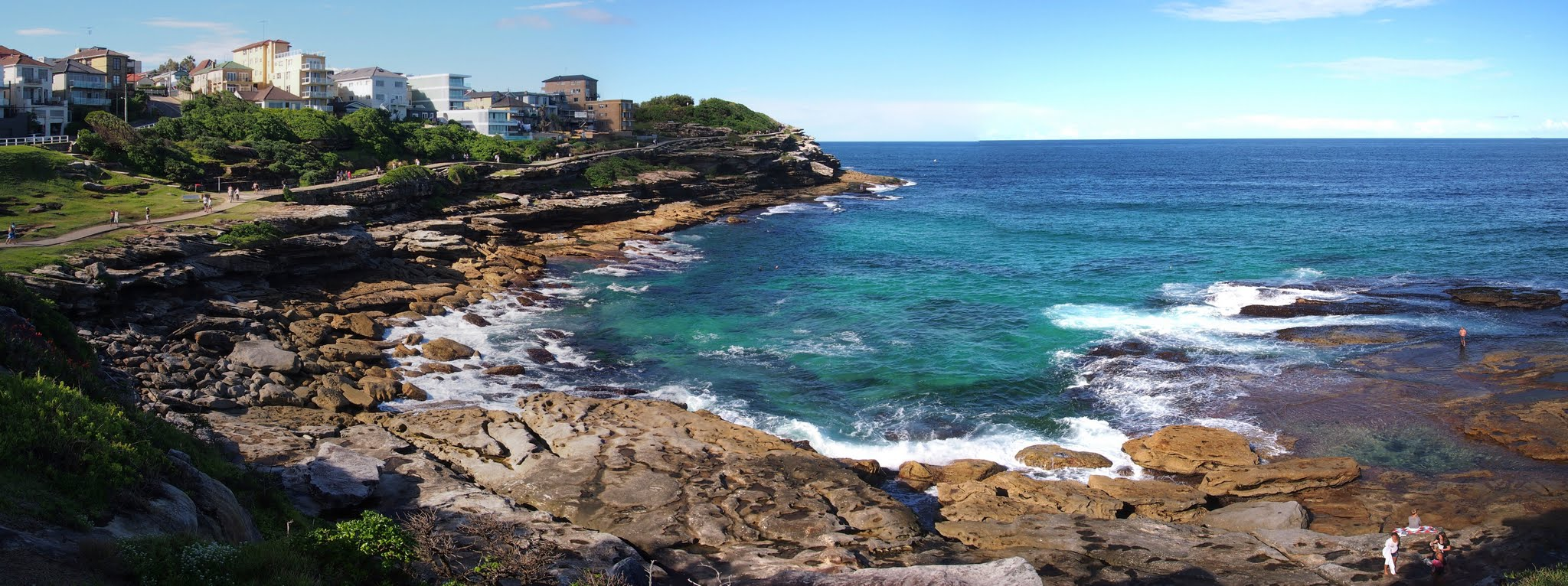
Mackenzies Bay, as a rocky inlet, in April 2013. The headland in the background is Mackenzies Point. Both are on the route of the Bondi to Coogee urban coastal walk, which is visible in the upper-left.

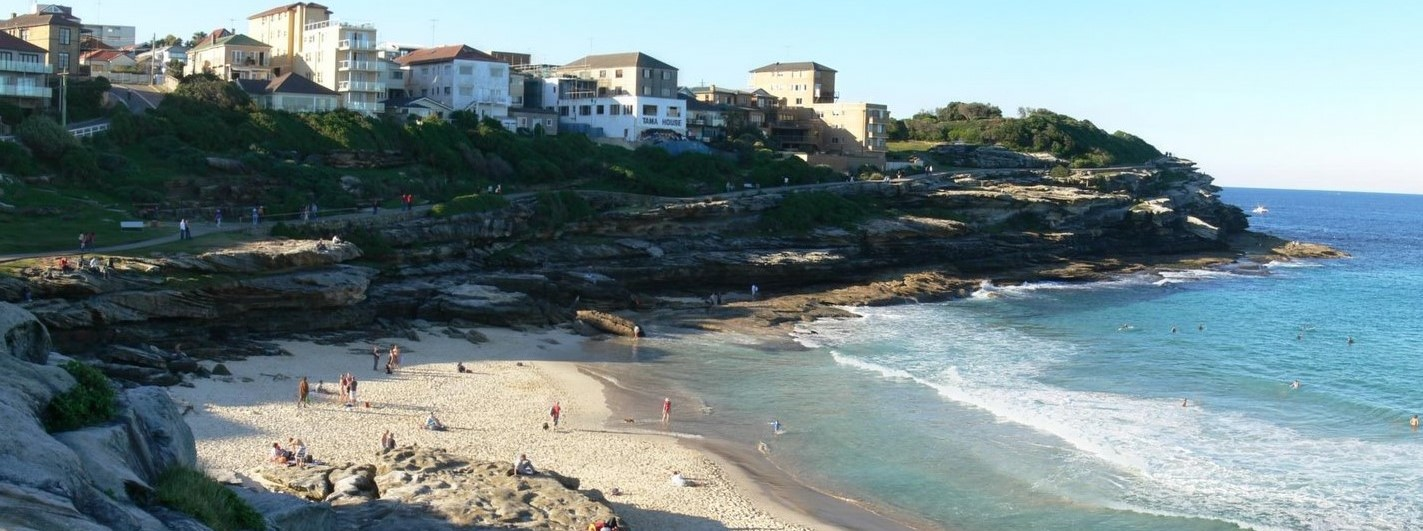
Mackenzies Bay, as a sandy beach, in July 2007. The year 2007 was unusual as the beach was present during winter.
