= Inflatable rescue boat =

Type of rescue boat

Inflatable Rescue Boats (IRBs) are rubber boats with an outboard motor used in surf lifesaving. IRBs have been used for all forms of surf rescue, retrieval, and service by Surf Lifesaving in New Zealand, Australia, and Del Mar, California since the late 1980s.

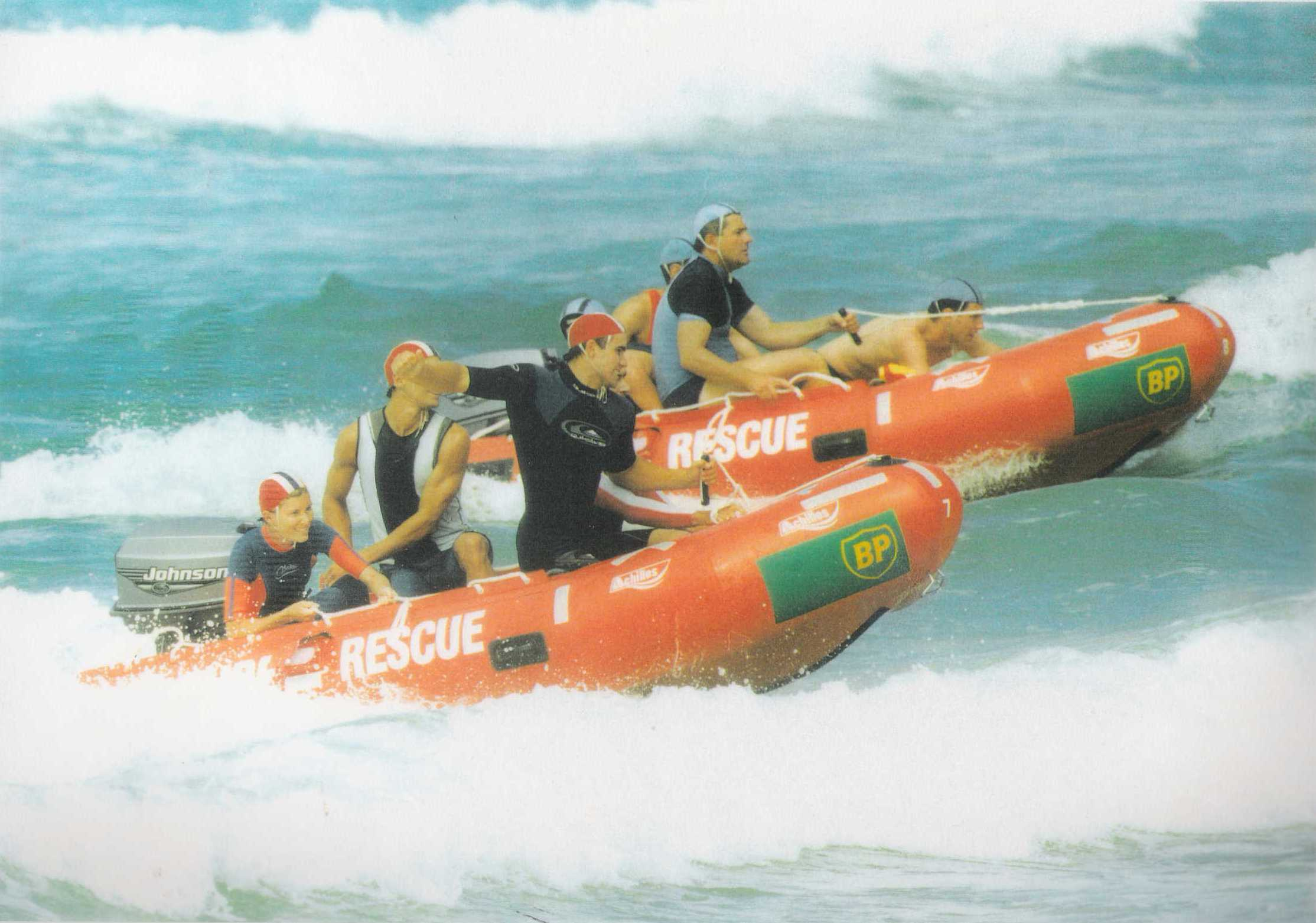
IRB's being raced

== Overview ==
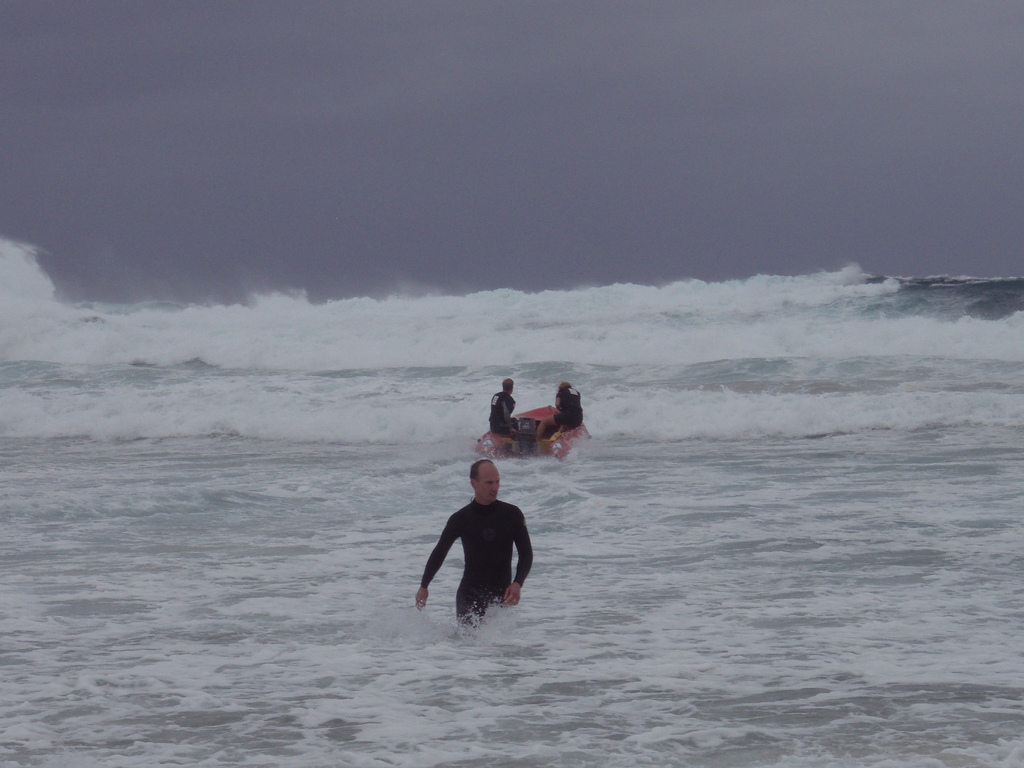
IRB launched in gale conditions, Bondi Beach Australia

IRBs are made of rubber and consist of four inflatable tubes - two side tubes, a bow tube and a keelson tube. This specific feature coupled with the obvious fact that they are used in the water, has coined the term "rubber duck" or simply "duck" to describe an IRB. Typically the rubber is coloured a shade of red termed 'Rescue Red' although a particular make of craft manufactured by Arancia come in a shade of orange. They have a rigid floor piece and a rigid transom for fitting an outboard motor (usually 25 hp). UK versions are equipped with 30hp Outboard 4-Stroke, with a Prop Deflector fitted to protect swimmers and the engine from rocks. This motor is capable of providing a maximum drive speed of between 25–30 knots on flat water. 2-Stroke fuel is stored in a flexible fuel bladder and is secured by 4 clips to the floor in the bow. An IRB is crewed by two people - an IRB Operator/Driver and an IRB Crewperson. The Operator sits on the lower half of the port side pontoon where they operate the outboard motor to control the boat. They have a single foot strap to help them stay in the boat. Their left hand can hold on to a strap on the port side pontoon and their right hand operates the outboard motor by means of a tiller arm and throttle. The Crewperson sits on the upper half of the starboard side pontoon. A handle is attached by a rope to the nose of the boat for them to hold with their left hand, while their right hand may hold a strap attached to the starboard pontoon. They balance the boat and allow it to go over large waves before they break without flipping. They also assist when going through a breaking wave, commonly referred to as "punching-through". As of 2026 only one foot strap per crew member is required, but two is common to accommodate body size variations and ease of carrying passengers.

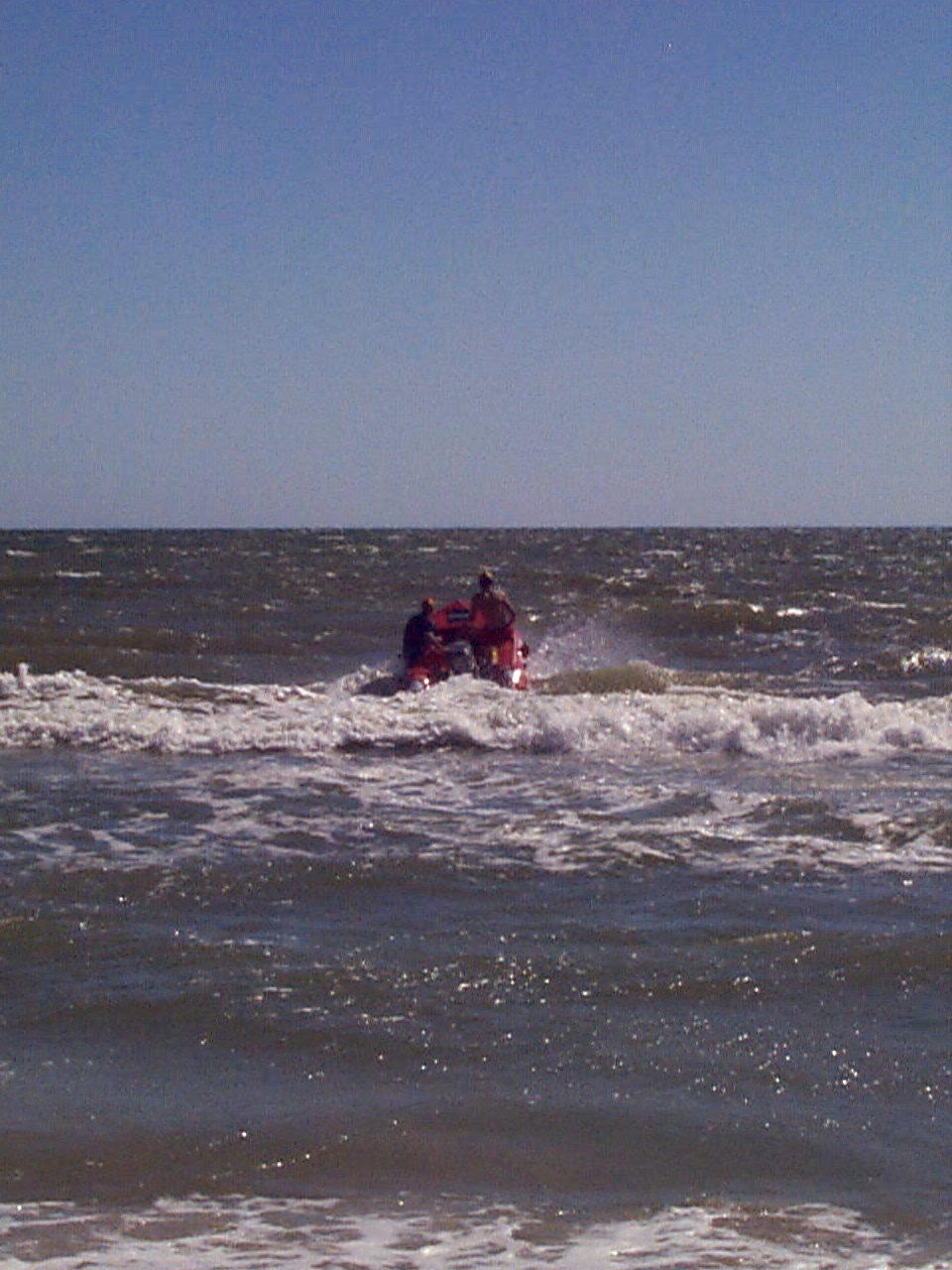
IRB after "punching-through" a wave at West Beach, South Australia.

IRB at Lorne VIC

== Brief history ==
In Australia, upon returning from life guard duties in the UK in 1969, Warren Mitchell OAM of the Avalon Beach Surf Life Saving Club (SLSC) had the idea for a rescue craft that could be deployed quickly under varying surf conditions and was adaptable to different Australian beaches. Warren proceeded to bring the English 'Dunlop' Inflatable Boat to Australia which was successfully adopted by his local club when the IRB performed a rescue of eight people in November 1969. By 1972 the French 'Zodiac’inflatable was also imported into Australia: with manager Ken Brown approaching Surf Life Saving Australia (SLSA) to test the French brand.

The first Zodiac IRB was developed in 1972 by Ken Brown of Zodiac Inflatable Boats Australia in conjunction with Harry Brown OAM of North Cronulla SLSC and SLSA. The Zodiac IRB was recognised as the superior performing IRB for SLSA across the country. Ken Brown soon improved the Zodiac IRB modifying the removable floor and transom, introducing new specifications accepted by SLSA. Originating at North Cronulla SLSC, the Zodiac IRB participated in several surf rescue competitions, including Soldiers Beach SLSC in the early 1970s. The new Zodiac IRB powered by a 25 hp Johnson motor (with propguard): demonstrated a live rescue in a much quicker time than previously experienced.

At the same event, a surf club crew member was injured during the collision of two traditional 'wooden' surf boats, highlighting yet another benefit of the 'rubber duck' for safety of surf rescue crews. The IRB measured 3.8m in length, setting the precedent for the familiar IRB now recognised today. By the early 1980s the Zodiac IRB was rolled out across Surf Life Saving Clubs in Australia and Ken Brown Marine had developed the rigid hull for the SLSA IRB. Brown and his team received an Australian Design Award in 1987 for the rigid hull. Since the introduction of the IRB more than 200,000 lives across the nation have been saved.

In New Zealand by 1978 the Mk I Arancia IRB was tested at Piha. During that test the first ever Arancia IRB rescue of a swimmer washed up on rocks was performed. The IRB is world renowned as a superior surf rescue craft.

== Patrolling ==
IRBs are of great value when patrolling a beach especially ocean surf beaches where either the surf is too powerful or the beach too large to perform rescues effectively on a board.

Prior to the start of a patrol, it is the driver's responsibility to ensure the craft is correctly set up and ready for patrolling duties. Typically this will involve inflating the crafts four pontoons to the correct pressure with a hand/foot or electric pump. The motor is test run in a tank of fresh water to check full function and reliability before installation to the transom. The fuel bladder is filled and installed along with a tow rope, rescue tube, two oars, a whistle and a blunt point knife as minimum. A check list is then filled in by the driver, after which the IRB may be signed on for patrol by radioing to their patrol captain or supervisor. At this point other patrol members assist to move the craft to a suitable launching position on the beach. The IRB is typically set up in a location outside the safe swimming area defined by the patrol flags. Where applicable, the boat may be towed onto the beach by way of a tractor or small jeep and trailer.

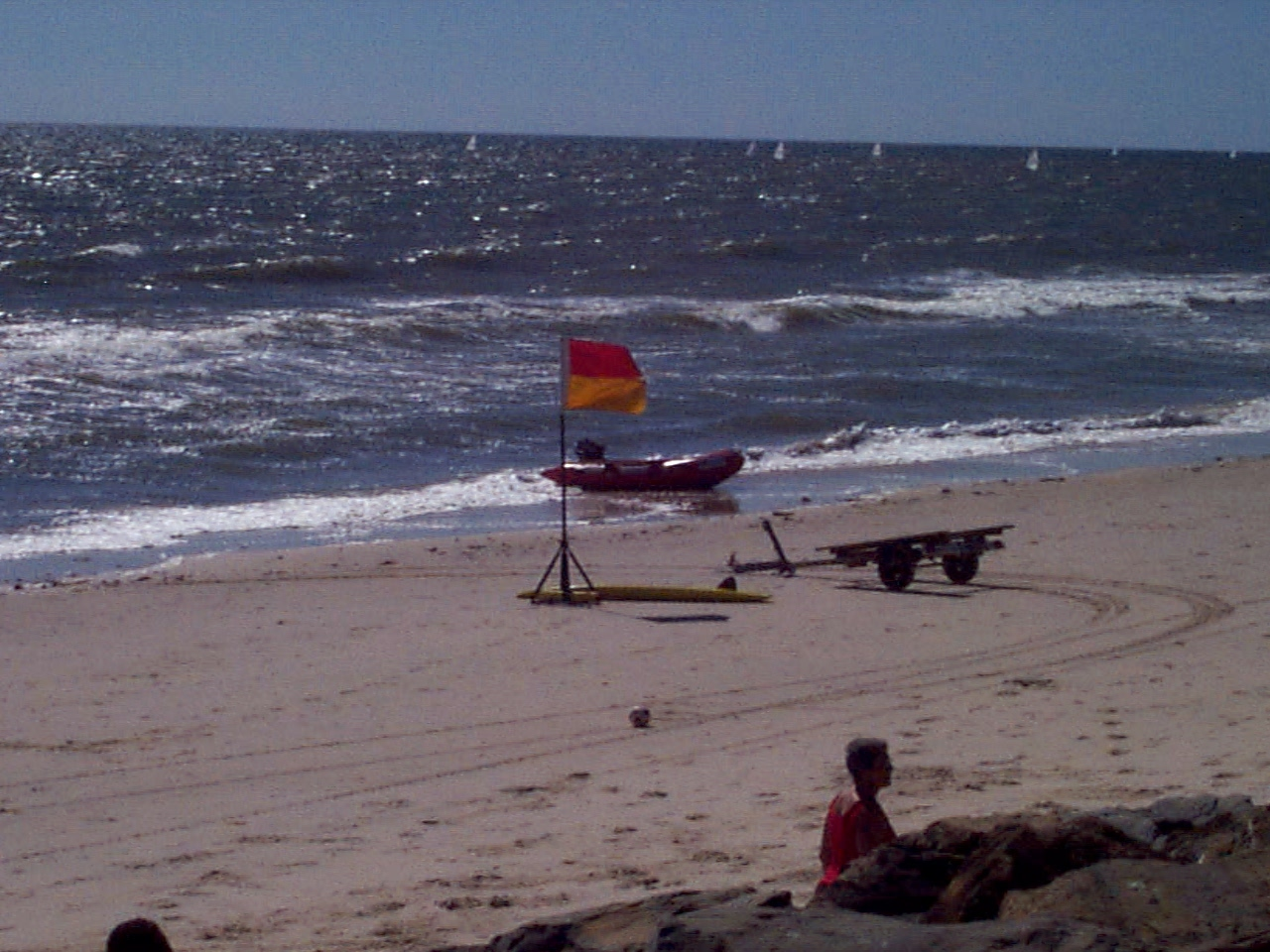
Beached IRB, ready for launching.

When performing a rescue, the driver must negotiate large surf breaks and possibly obstacles such as rocks or other swimmers to reach the patient. The crewperson helps the driver by keeping a lookout for the patient and hazards. They are also instrumental in keeping the IRB balanced when crossing surf breaks and turning rapidly. The crewperson is also primarily responsible for bringing the patient on board, often during extremely dangerous and rapidly changing conditions, and looking after their welfare while at sea.

The crew of an IRB can communicate with the shore through various accepted hand signals or through modern waterproof radios which are becoming more popular.

During a patrol, an IRB will be left on the beach by the waters edge at all times ready for action. On a busy day an IRB may be permanently out the back checking on swimmers.

On conclusion of the patrol, it is imperative the IRB is correctly packed up and stored to ensure it is ready for use by the next patrol, left in a "rescue ready" state. This is also the responsibility of the driver, who will usually start by radioing surf command and signing the IRB off for the day. This may involve reporting any rescues as well as how many people are still on the beach and in the water. Once the IRB has been signed off, the boat is taken up to the club where the motor is removed and run in a tank of fresh water for approximately 10 minutes. This clears the remaining salt water still in the cooling system, and allows for a quick check over of important parts of the motor. At the same time the IRB is emptied of oars, fuel tank, tube etc. The IRB will require a thorough hose down to remove sand, salt and shell grit, on and inside the boat. Standing the boat upright against a wall allows the water to fall down and out of the boat taking with it these unwanted particles. The boat is then returned to the trailer and the four pontoons are allowed to semi-deflate, to prevent over-stretching of the seams and rubber. The driver will fill in a checklist and report any faults, problems or issues to the IRB Captain or a supervisor and log it in a book before storing the craft and motor. They will also report weather conditions and rescues performed for the day.

== Licensing Requirements ==
=== IRB Driver ===
In Australia, surf club members must hold a Bronze Medallion, IRB Crewperson Certificate as well as obtaining a boat drivers' licence from state authorities to undertake an IRB training course. This course is usually arranged by the club when enough interested members have gathered. The course involves a small theory component on basic outboard motor mechanics, pontoon pressure as well as set-up and dismantling procedures. This is coupled with a much larger practical component. The practical sessions require learning basic operation and maneuvering techniques as well as gaining the ability to negotiate large, rough surf, with and without a Crewperson.

Other practical components include:

- Towing
- Signalling/Communications
- Patient pick-up
- Recovery. For example, from an up-turned boat.

Training typically takes 6–8 weeks, by which time the group members are ready to be assessed by a qualified person. Upon successful completion of the course members gain their Silver Medallion in IRB driving and may henceforth operate the IRB for the club. Annually, drivers must undertake a reassessment organised by the club to prove they are still proficient.

=== Crewperson Certification ===
Nationally as from 1 January 2003, it became compulsory for club members to hold a crewpersons’ certificate in order to crew in an IRB. Previously, the minimum requirement for crewing in an IRB was possession of the Bronze Medallion. This changed amidst safety concerns over training procedures relating to the correct positioning of feet and body in the boat. It was decided that the skills involved in correctly and safely crewing an IRB were enough that a complete course was required of and by itself. Holders of the drivers certificate automatically qualified as crewperson.

To complete the IRB crewperson course club members must be 15 and hold a Bronze Medallion.

The IRB Crewperson syllabus covers:

- IRB theory
- IRB operations and Crewing Positions
- IRB set-up and pack-down operations
- Signals

The IRB Crewperson course is equivalent to the national unit of competency PUA30319 Crew Small powercraft in a rescue operation.

== Competition ==
IRBs are used for water cover during ocean sports, such as ocean swims, surf carnivals and triathlons. But during the winter months they are put to the test when clubs from around the state and nationally compete against each other by racing IRBs in a number of events: see IRB racing.

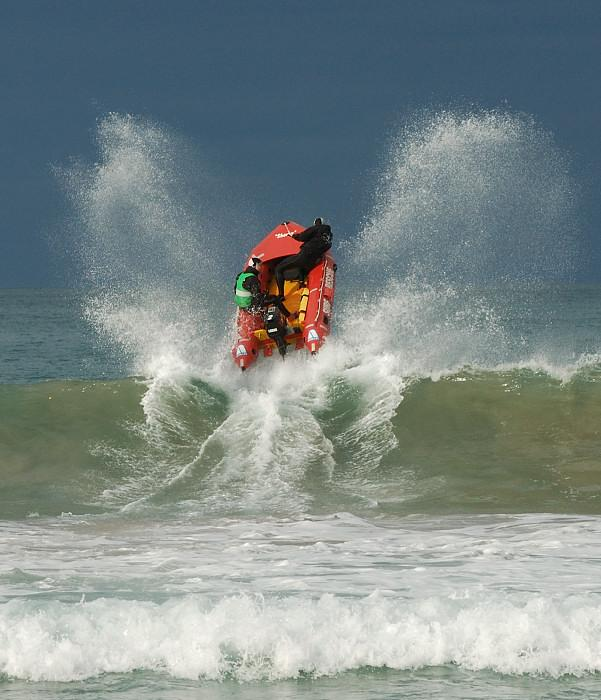
Lorne crew punching through a wave at State Titles

== See also ==
- Inflatable boat
- Rescue craft
- Y-class lifeboat
- Arancia-class lifeboat
