= Tamarama =

- Suburb
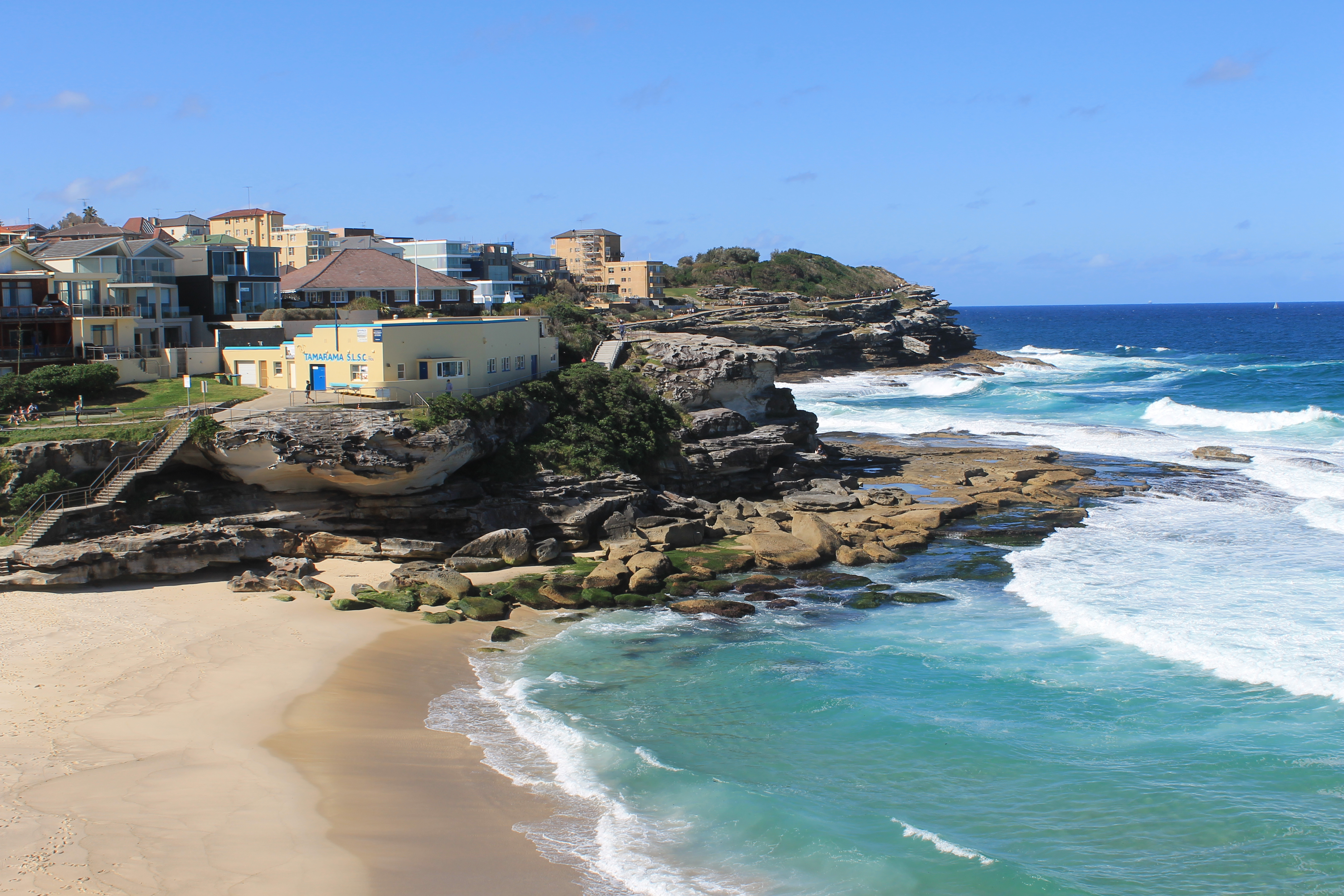
- Tamarama Beach

- Interactive map of Tamarama
- Country: Australia
- State: New South Wales
- City: Sydney
- LGA: Waverley Council
- Location: 7 km (4.3 mi) east of Sydney CBD

Government
  - State electorate: Coogee
  - Federal division: Wentworth

Area
  - Total: 0.28 km^{2} (0.11 sq mi)

Population
  - Total: 1,478 (SAL 2021)
  - Density: 5,292/km^{2} (13,710/sq mi)
- Postcode: 2026
Suburbs around Tamarama
Bondi	Bondi Beach
Bondi	Tamarama	Tasman Sea
Bronte	Bronte

Tamarama is a beachside eastern suburb of Sydney, in the state of New South Wales, Australia. Tamarama is 6 kilometres east of the Sydney central business district, in the local government area of Waverley Council.

Tamarama has a small ocean beach about 1 kilometre south of Bondi Beach and a couple of hundred metres north of Bronte Beach. The suburb is mostly residential and the beach and adjacent parklands have been popular places for recreation such as swimming, surfing, sunbaking and picnics for more than a century.

== History ==
Initially known as Dixon Bay by early European settlers, the name was changed to Tamarama in the 1800s. Tamarama is probably a derivation of the Aboriginal name 'Gamma Gamma' (possibly meaning 'storm'), which appeared on maps of the coastline in the 1860s by the Military or Naval Authority. In the late 1890s a genteel campaign of civil disobedience was undertaken to open up Sydney beaches to daytime bathing. Inspector of schools and writer George Philip was credited with winning the day in Tamarama.

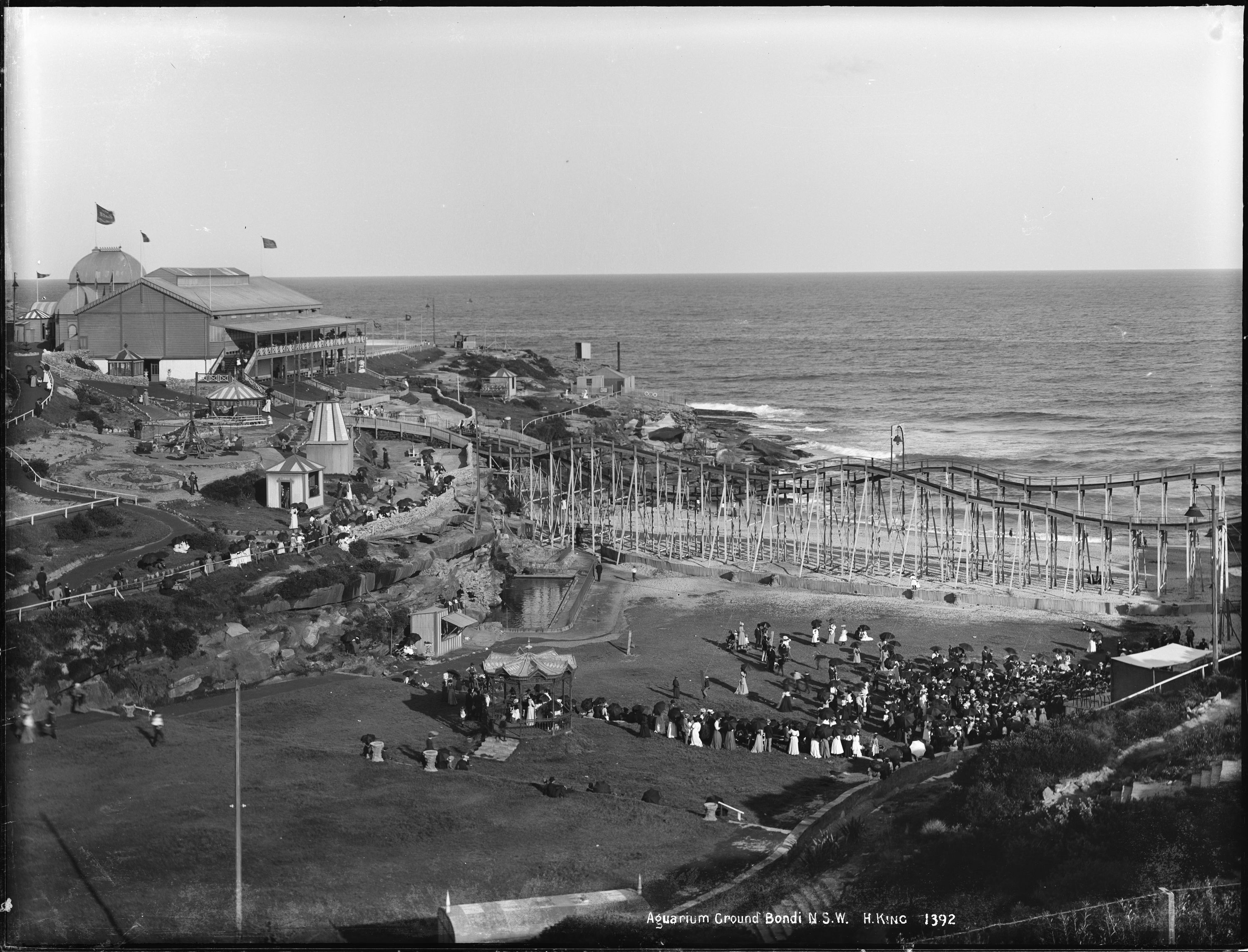
The Bondi Aquarium at Tamarama, circa 1890

In 1887 Sydney's first coastal amusement park, and one of the earliest in Australia, opened at Tamarama. Named The Bondi Aquarium its greatest attraction was a plunging roller coaster that dived and twisted over the beach. People flocked to the attraction, not only for the rides, but for vaudeville acts and aquarium creatures, including seals and a tiger shark. On the evening of 11 July 1891, fire destroyed the aquarium and pavilion, but it rose from the ashes in September the same year, and continued to entertain Sydney's populace. The last identified concert at the Aquarium was a fund raiser for the Waverley Benevolent Society in July 1906.

Ownership and management changed several times throughout its existence, until the site was finally sold by Mrs Margaret J. Lachaume in 1906 to William Anderson who transformed the amusement park, renaming it Wonderland City. In 1906 Wonderland City opened and replaced the Bondi Aquarium as the latest attraction at Tamarama. Powered by its own steam plant, the amusement park featured an airship suspended over the bay and an elephant named Alice available for rides on the beach. There was also a miniature railway operating on a two-mile track over the cliff tops. Frequent battles with local residents over beach access, charges of animal cruelty and an incident with the airship saw a decline in numbers. After a few years of low crowds and poor revenue Wonderland City closed in 1911. In 1920, the NSW Government bought the area and proclaimed it Tamarama Park. There is still a Wonderland Avenue at Tamarama. The first mayor of Waverley (David Fletcher) lived in Tamarama.

== Population ==
In the 2021 census, there were 1,478 people in Tamarama. 61.6% of people were born in Australia; the next most common countries of birth included England at 7.8%, New Zealand at 2.6%, South Africa at 2.4%, the United States of America at 2.2%, and Canada at 1.2%. 72.1% of people spoke only English at home; the next most common languages spoken at home included French at 2.4%, Greek at 1.2%, Spanish at 1.2%, German at 0.9%, and Italian at 0.7%. The most common responses for religion included No Religion at 49.0%, Catholic at 16.4%, Anglican at 9.4%, and Judaism at 6.3%; a further 7.6% of respondents for this area elected not to disclose their religious status.

Incomes for this area were high, at $4,522 weekly household income compared to the national average of $1,746; other metrics were high as well such as personal income at $1,788 (the national median was $805), and family income which was $4,771 compared to the national median of $2,120. Monthly mortgage repayments were also high at $4,109.

== Tamarama Beach ==
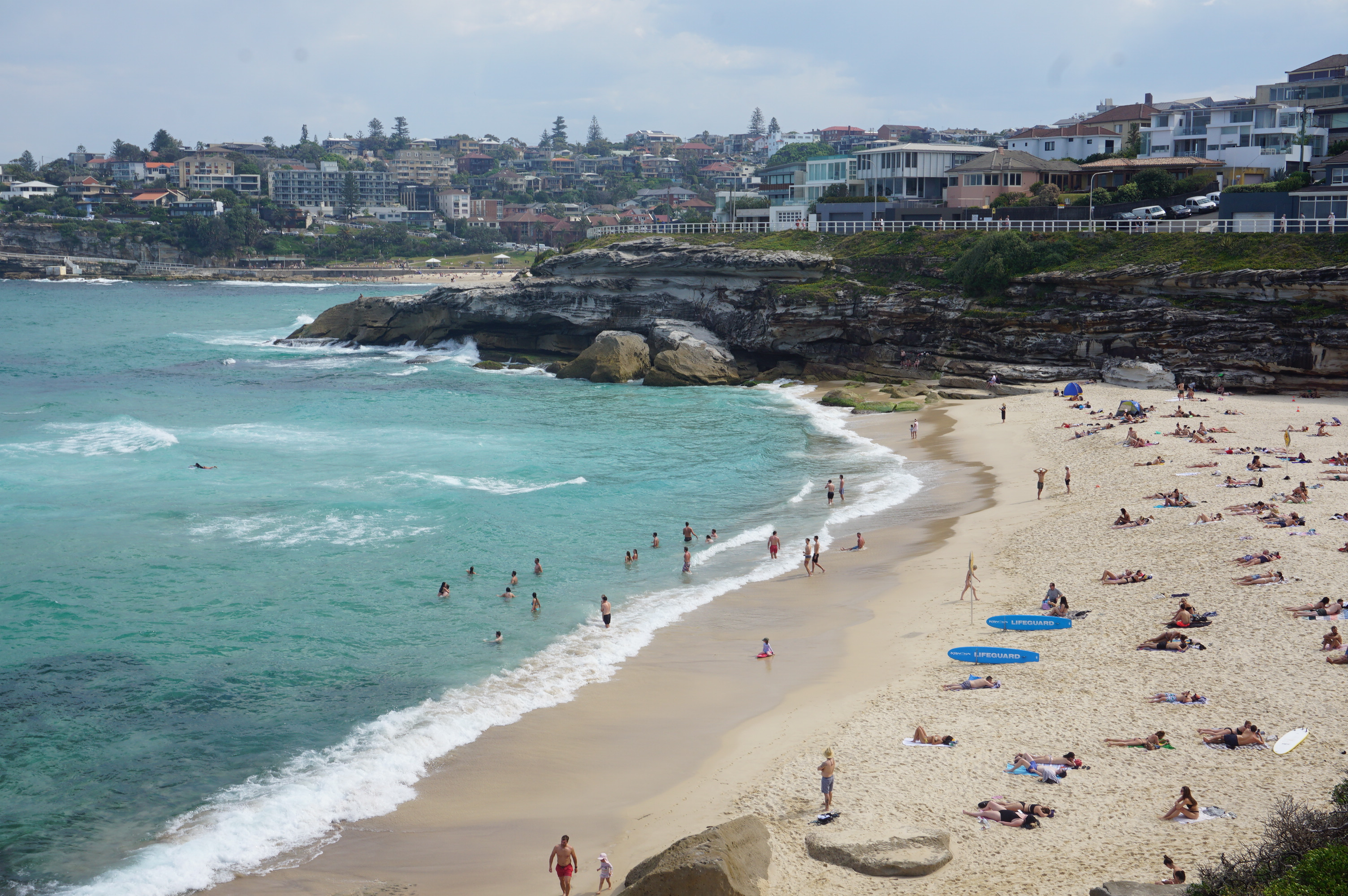
Tamarama

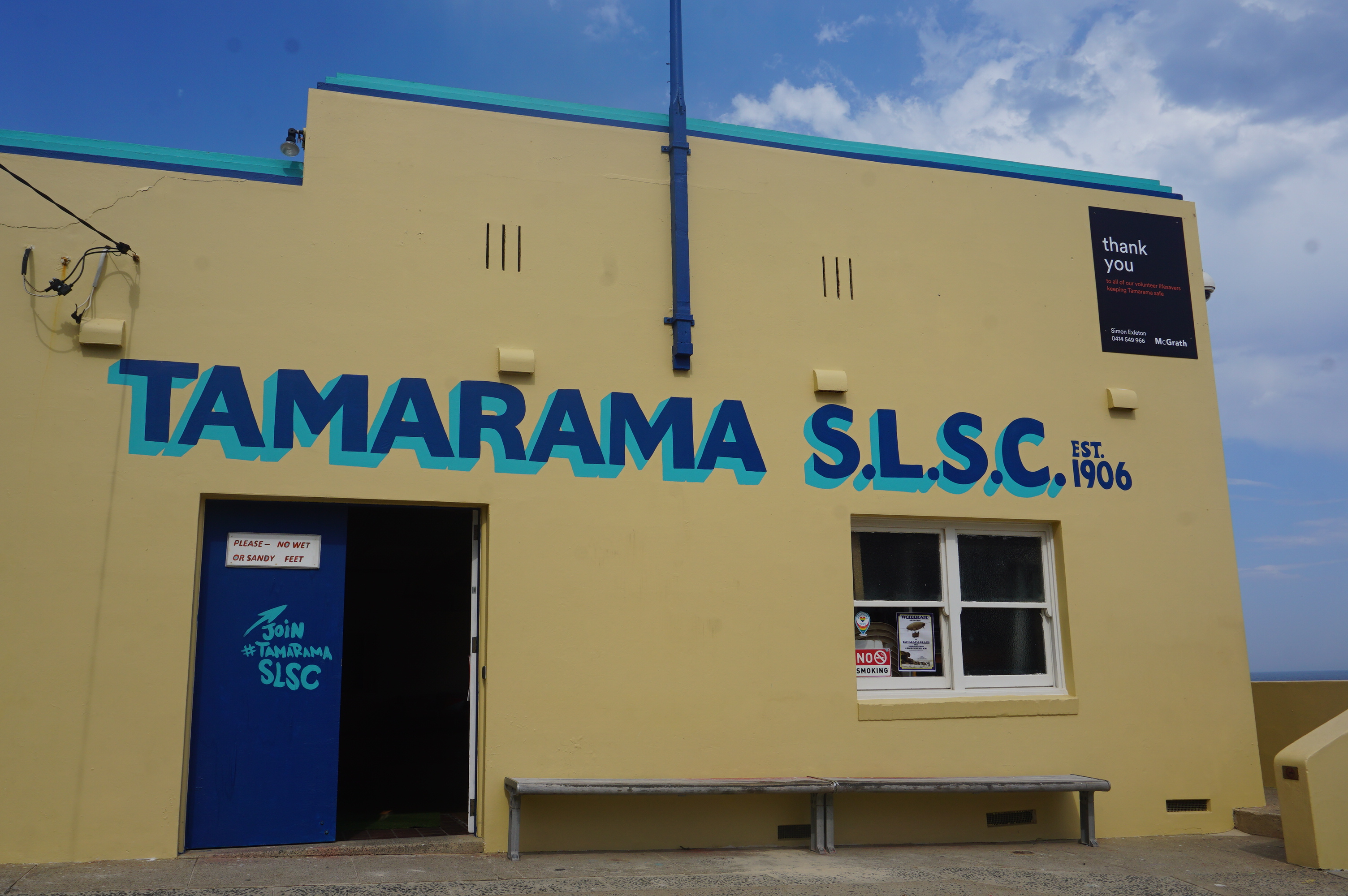
Tamarama Beach Surf Lifesaving Club

Tamarama Beach is a small beach between two prominent headlands, with a sand filled valley to the back, surrounded by pleasant parkland and picnic areas. Tamarama is an extremely narrow beach and deceptive for its size. Tamarama Beach is often referred to as Glamarama (or Glamourama), owing to the alleged abundance of glamorous people who sunbathe (often topless), on what must be one of the smallest strips of sand in the state. Tamarama Surf Club is located on the northern side, perched up on the headland where it overlooks the entire beach.

Because of its deep water, small size and easterly aspect, Tamarama is dangerous for most swimmers even in a moderate ocean swell. Tamarama is considered the most dangerous patrolled beach in New South Wales, with more rescues per thousand bathers than any other of Sydney's beaches, by the Tamarama Surf Life Saving Club.

A small swell can produce rip currents of up to 2 metres a second (which is about the speed of the current 50 metre men's world record). One or two rip currents are always present, making the entire surf zone virtually all rip. When the swell really rolls in, an offshore rock shelf shapes a stunning 12 to 15-foot wave that draws committed board-riders, photographers and onlookers, taking in the grand spectacle from the cliffs above.

Just to the north of Tamarama Beach is the locality of Mackenzies Bay, which is also a part of the shoreline boundary of Tamarama.

== Sport and recreation ==
Tamarama is represented in one of the most popular sporting competitions across Australia, the National Rugby League competition, by the local team the Sydney Roosters, officially the Eastern Suburbs District Rugby League Football Club (ESDRLFC).

=== Events ===
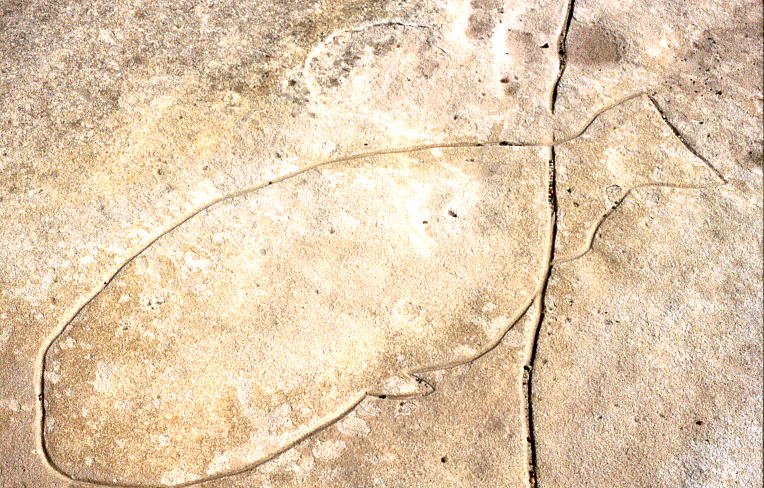
Aboriginal rock carving

Tamarama is in the middle of the "Bondi to Bronte Ocean Walk" which is one of the most popular coastal walking routes in Australia. The beach and parkland form part of the exhibition space for Sculpture by the Sea, a free annual event in late spring and the most popular outdoor artistic exhibition in Australia.

=== Surf Lifesaving Club ===
The beach is home to one of the first surf lifesaving clubs in the world, Tamarama Surf Life Saving Club, that was founded in 1906. The Club proudly boasts an enviable record of not having lost a single life to a mishap in the surf in over 100 years of surf life saving patrols. This is a remarkable achievement given that the under tows or "rips" in the surf zone are regarded as being amongst the most dangerous on the east coast of the Australian continent.

On 2 July 2014 Matthew Richell, CEO of Hachette Australia died from misadventure when he was swept up against the rocks of a sea cliff by the surf and then carried back into deeper water where he drowned as a result of being incapacitated by head injuries. He was surfing during a time when Tamarama beach was not patrolled by lifeguards and could not be resuscitated by emergency crews.

== Memorial ==
In October 2021 a memorial dedicated to gay men and transgender women targeted in homophobic and transphobic attacks in Sydney from the 1970s to 1990s, was unveiled. The public art is located in Marks Park.
