= NSLS =

NSLS can refer to:

- National Synchrotron Light Source
- Nova Scotia Lifeguard Service
