= Life saving reel =

Device used by surf lifesavers

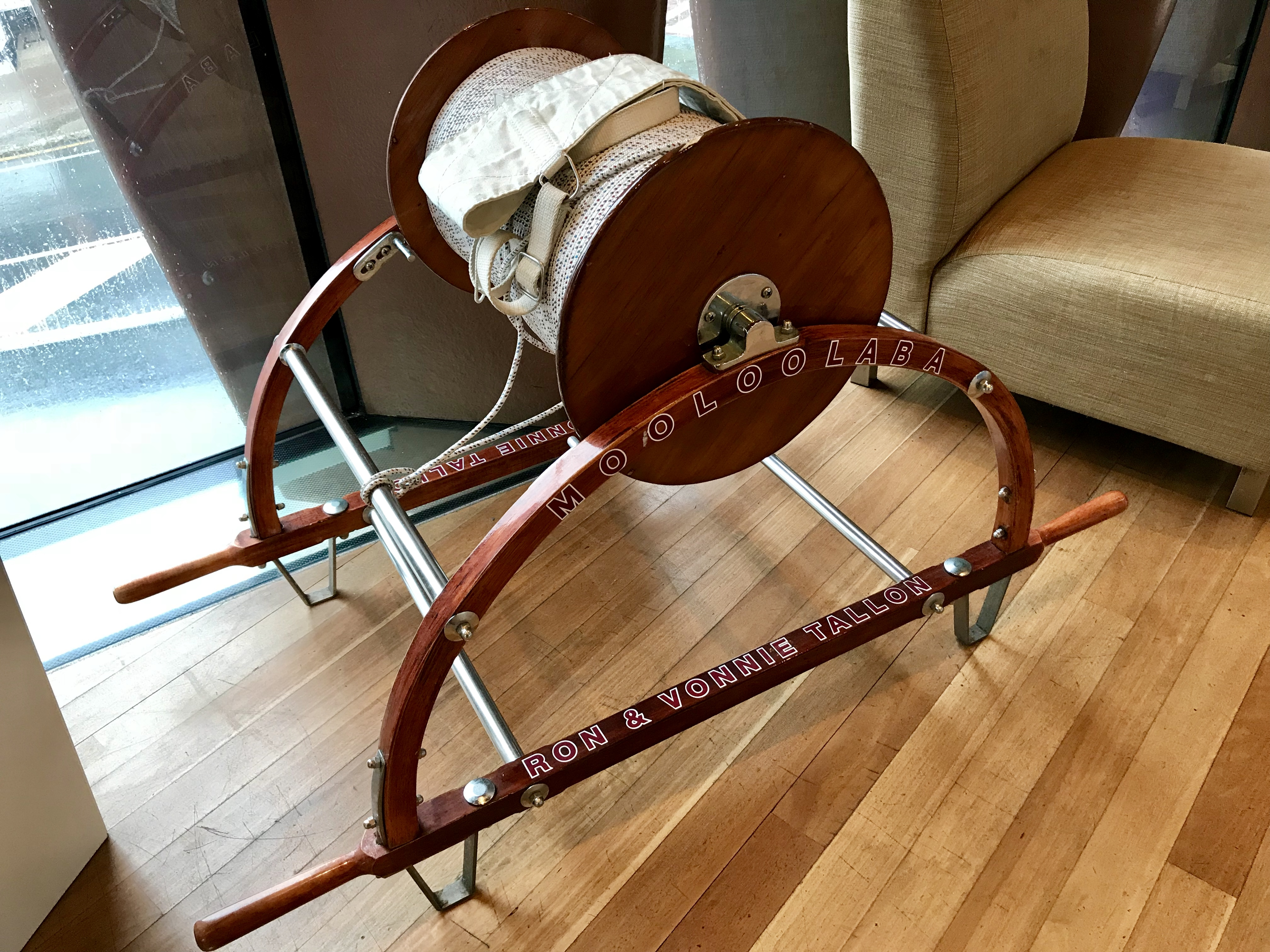
Life saving reel

The surf life saving reel was a beach life saving apparatus from Australia.

Lyster Ormsby, Percy Flynn and Sig Fullwood are credited as the inventors of the first life saving reel in 1906. (Note: Others claim a similar method had already been invented, or modified by W H Biddell at Bronte who had a reel attached to his Torpedo Buoy pre 1906. Other sources state it was Sgt John Bond of Victoria Barracks in Paddington who built the first full sized reel and this was improved on in the same year by Sydney coachbuilder G H Olding.) It was used for a display of proper methods to be employed in rescuing on 24 March 1907 and was named the "alarm reel". It was then later that year redesigned by G H Olding and was fabricated at GH Olding & Sons coachbuilders using carriage wheels to create the arches of the reel. It was a giant reel with rope wrapped around it with a harness at the end. The reel rested in a frame that would rest on the sand. The life saver would attach the harness to his or her self then swim out to the struggling bather/surfer. Once they reached the patient they would attach the patient to the harness and another life saver on the beach would reel them in. The life saver in the water would tend to another patient or swim alongside the patient to reassure them if they were conscious or make sure that nothing went wrong if they were unconscious.

The actual reel and rope would weigh about 50–60 pounds (23–27 kg) and was officially made part of the surf lifesaving community on Sunday 24 March 1906. The reel then was used in the British Isles shortly after being invented.

This large reel was redesigned to the modern design by members of the Tamarama Surf Life Saving Club in 1908 and has remained fundamentally unchanged to the current day. Utilising an 8mm cotton line coated in beeswax and an attached belt/harness the Tamarama model was readily portable and able to be carried to rescues with the floating line negating many of the issues of the heavy line of its predecessor.

One of the last places to accept the reel was Cairns in 1925. The reel was used up to 1993 as a primary rescue method until the early 1980s from which time its use declined as rescue boards and inflatable rescue boats offered greater ease and speed in surf conditions. The surf life saving reel continues to be used today in a number of surf lifesaving competition events, notably Rescue and Resuscitation and March Past.

Anecdotally, the first person to be rescued at Bondi using the reel was the famous aviator Charles Kingsford Smith.

The surf life saving reel was especially useful during the disaster on 6 February 1938. This day at Bondi was given the name Black Sunday after the events that took place on that day. On this day a series of freak waves hit the beach and washed about 300 bathers into rough surf conditions where most required assistance. 80 surf life savers equipped with 8 reels saved all but 4 swimmers that died before reaching shore. These were the first surf related deaths ever on Bondi beach. Surf life saving reels are still used today at carnivals in the March Past events. In this one team from each club marches as a team of 12 carrying the reel and their club's flag around a course to bag pipes. This is pretty much the only use of the reel today.
