= IRB racing =

Surf sport

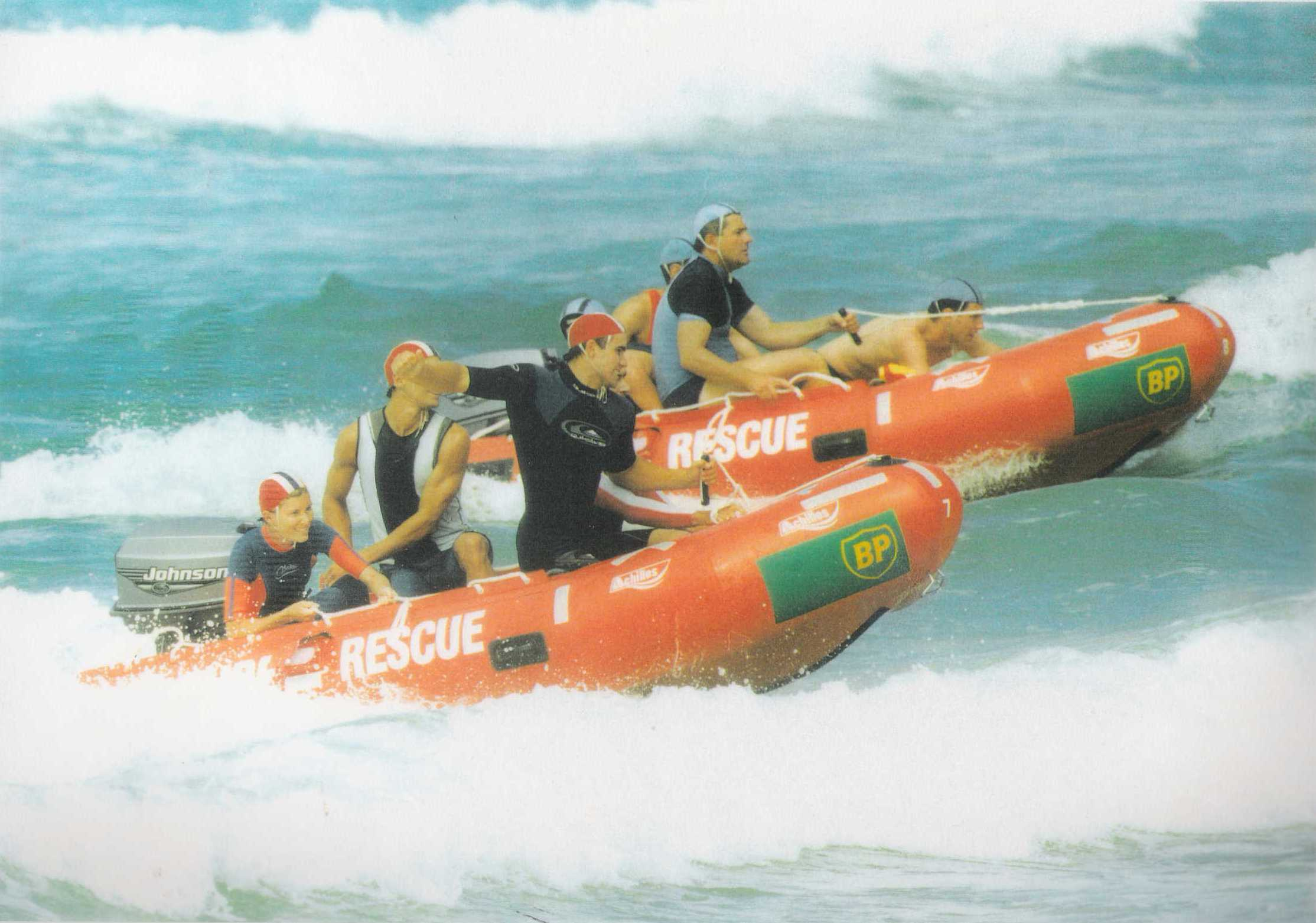
IRBs being raced

Inflatable rescue boat (IRB) racing, is a surf sport in which surf lifesaving club teams race inflatable rescue boats. IRB racing competitions are held in various countries, including Australia, New Zealand, South Africa, the United Kingdom, the United States, Japan, Germany, and France.

IRB racing consists of a number of simulated rescue events, with the aim of improving lifesaver skills through competition. Competition rules vary from nation to nation; however, the International Life Saving Federation adopted the Australian rules for the 2008 IRB World Championship.

== Overview ==
Since the mid 1980s, there has been a form of IRB Racing competition with SLSA.

The aim of Competition is to; (i) Improve the prowess of IRB drivers and crewpersons (crew). (ii) Encourage crews to correctly equip and maintain their IRB and motors for optimum safe performance and reliability for both lifesaving patrol duties and competition. (iii) Allow crews to demonstrate their techniques and their abilities to perform a rescue. (iv) Bring crews together to discuss and improve IRB techniques and operations. (v) Promote safety awareness techniques for the crew and patients in simulated rescue scenarios.

A strong emphasis will be placed on safe driving, crewing and patient safety practices. All competitors must complete each event in a safe and controlled speed and manner or will face immediate disqualification from the event, and/or issue of a safety infringement and consideration for further penalties.

During the early 2000s, however, competition was not practiced, (between 2002 -04 seasons), Competition was suspended altogether. This was due to SLSA having major issues and problems associated with the IRB during normal summer patrols and then the winter competition. - due to insurance issues and number of injuries to participants). See below.

Typically Competition takes place at carnivals that are held at different beaches, spread out over the off-season, between the months of April and July. Each carnival involving a number of events, these events are designed to simulate the real time rescue situations typically found on beaches during the summer /patrol season period.

The IRB rescue events have the Rescue Surf Rescue, the Mass Rescue, the Tube Rescue, a Team Relay Rescue, and the Assembly Rescue.

Each event is simulated rescue by a team representing their particular club. For most events, the team consists of an Driver, a Crew person, and a Patient, though this is not the case with regard to the Team Relay, and Mass Rescue events where additional drivers, crew members and patients are involved.

Depending on the number of crews participating in the each event, events are usually run in heats, semi-finals, and finals. Team placement within the races, determines which teams move onto the next round and those that are eliminated.

Carnivals are contested at both, Local State, State Titles and National Titles Level and during the International Lifesaving Championships.

== Brief history ==
Soldiers Beach Surf Life Saving Club (SLSC) is regarded as the first club to develop the idea of racing IRBs under simulated rescue scenarios to assist drivers and crews in enhancing their skills. Starting in the early 1970s, the events were continuously refined until 1976, when Surf Life Saving Australia endorsed a set of IRB competition guidelines. IRB racing and competition flourished and continued to grow in popularity with surf clubs from across Australia.

Clubs in each Australian state have competed against each other at regularly scheduled carnivals throughout the season in preparation for the annually held state titles. Clubs that do well in state titles submit teams for competition in national titles or "Aussies".

=== Competition safety review ===
Due to mounting safety concerns relating to IRB racing, competition was suspended for a period of two years, beginning at the end of the 2000/2001 season. During this time the rules applied to racing IRBs in competition were thoroughly scrutinised. Eventually, a new format for racing was presented for trial during the 2003/2004 season. The new rules required patient head protection, plus changes to procedures for starting and finishing races, as well as craft launching.

Previously, a driver and crew person started all races (minus the Assembly) behind a starting line approximately 5–10 meters from the shore line. The craft was positioned at the water's edge, nose facing away from the sea. Upon firing of the starter's gun, the driver and crew person would run up to the boat and swing it around, dragging it to an appropriate depth for launching.

As a result of the Safety Review, the rules were modified to call for the craft to be placed at the water's edge, nose facing out to sea. Both the driver and crew person start the race standing outside of the boat, but in contact with the craft. The driver must not be in contact with the motor in any way. After the starter's gun fires, the driver and crew person may proceed to drag the craft to an appropriate depth before the driver jumps in and starts the motor to begin the race.

Patients must be of a minimum age of 15 years and possess the Bronze Medallion and crew person's certificate.

== Scrutineering ==
In its simplest form, 'scrutineering' is a way of standardising craft performance in order to make the competition fair and equally matched. Scrutineering involves inspecting and checking the craft, the motor, and accessories (including fuel type) for compliance to the specifications outlined in competition guidelines.

It is carried out by competition officials a few days prior to competition. No team may enter a craft into competition without its first passing scrutineering. Officials look for modifications to the motor, confirm correct fuel type, and check that all craft carry the minimum list of IRB accessories.

== Marshalling ==
Marshalling is performed approximately 10 minutes prior to an event's commencing, to ensure all participating team members (driver, crew person and patient) are present and accounted for. Any team or member failing to show up to marshalling before a cut-off time are disqualified from the race. During marshalling, teams are allocated their own lane and designated buoy colour.

After marshalling, all patients are taken to a craft termed the duty boat, which transports them to the buoys in their respective lanes.

== Event Descriptions ==
=== Surf rescue ===
Surf Rescue is a competitive event requiring only one driver, one crew person and the patient. This race simulates the most basic form of rescue: to pick up a single patient in trouble.

The race starts with the boat positioned on the shore line, nose facing out to sea. As viewed from the beach, the patient is placed to the right of a buoy positioned approximately 140 metres directly out from the shore. On initial firing of the starter's gun, driver and crew proceed to drag the craft to an appropriate depth. The crew person holds the boat steady, allowing the driver to jump in and start the motor. The moment the motor fires up, the crew person jumps inside the boat, grabs the rope handle, and positions themselves to be ready for the patient pick up. The boat will now be in full operation and heading toward the patient as fast as possible. Depending on surf conditions, the driver and crew person may need to negotiate breaking waves, in which case the crew person must clamber as far forward on the bow pontoon as possible to ensure the boat does not flip but punches through the wave instead.

Once the craft is within 10 metres of the patient, the driver will back the speed off slightly while the crew person leans out across the port side pontoon, preparing their left arm to form a solid hook. In preparation for pick-up, the patient links both hands in a loop above their head. Precision positioning by the driver is required to ensure the craft comes up just next to the patient so that the crew person may hook the patient and pull them into the boat. The driver then turns sharply around the buoy and the entire team prepares for a quick dash back to the shore by ducking down into the boat as far as possible to reduce their wind resistance. During the return to shore, the driver will usually travel at top speed, popping over breaking waves and driving down the face of spilling waves. As the craft hits the beach, the driver must 'kill', or stop, the motor, exit the boat and make a final dash to the finish line to complete the race.

The Surf Rescue is performed in both male and female categories.

=== IRB Team Rescue ===
Each teams is composed of two patients and two crews (one driver and one crew member per crew). The patient is positioned on the seaward side of a designated buoy. Both crews are positioned on the beach side of the crew start/finish line adjacent to their beach position indicator.

On the starter's signal, the first crew launches the IRB and proceeds through the surf to the patient. On the inside of the turn (as the IRB rounds the buoy), the crew member jumps overboard on the seaward side of the buoy. The driver completes the buoy turn and returns to shore alone.

Meanwhile, the crew member of the second crew moves into the water. The first driver stays in contact and in control of the IRB until the second crew member secures and takes control of the IRB. The first driver runs up the beach and crosses the crew start/finish line to tag the second driver who proceeds to the IRB.

The second crew re-launches the IRB, precedes through the surf to pick up the patient and the first crew member, rounds their buoy, and returns to shore to finish the event.

=== Mass rescue ===
Mass Rescue is a competitive event that simulates a rescue in which more than one patient is in trouble. Hence, it requires more than one trip back to the buoy to complete the rescue.

Specifically, the Mass Rescue involves picking up two different patients, in separate trips to the buoy, with a simulated driver changeover in between. It proceeds as follows. Before the rescue begins, the team's two patients are transported to the buoy, with one positioned in front of it and the other positioned behind. The first leg of the Mass Rescue is identical to the Surf Rescue race, except that the IRB travels around the buoy in an anti-clockwise pattern and the first patient to be picked up is the one located behind the buoy.

After the first patient is picked up, the team returns to shore, the driver turns off the motor and puts it into neutral. The driver then exits the IRB, runs up the beach, around a turning post, and then back to the boat for the second leg. During the driver's run, the rescued patient exits the boat, and the crew person turns the IRB around to face the surf once again. At the same time, the patient still in the water moves from a position in front of the buoy to a position behind it, and prepares for pick-up.

As soon as the driver returns to the boat, they enter the boat and the second leg proceeds as the first. Once the second patient has been successfully picked up and the IRB has returned to shore, the driver cuts the motor, places it into neutral, exits the boat and runs over the finish line to complete the race.

The Mass Rescue is a test of a crew's strength and endurance.

=== Tube rescue ===
Tube Rescue is a competitive event that simulates the act of rescuing a patient with the use of a flexible foam rescue tube.

It consists of a driver, crew person, and patient. In this race, two buoys are positioned 25 metres apart in the water. The patient is placed at the buoy farthest away from the shore. The race starts in the same way as the Surf Rescue. However, when the craft reaches the first buoy, the driver circles it anti-clockwise. As the craft passes around the right side of the buoy, the crew person, with the lanyard of the rescue tube looped over their body, disembarks into the water. The crew person then proceeds to swim to the second buoy, trailing the rescue tube behind.

Upon approaching the second buoy, the crew person pulls the tube in and passes it to the waiting patient. The patient assists the crew person by wrapping the tube around the front of their chest, then leaning forward so the crew person may clip the two ends of the tube together. Once this is done, the crew person swims around the buoy and heads back towards the first buoy and the awaiting driver and craft. The patient must now lean back and kick as hard as possible to assist the crew person. Meanwhile, the driver waits on the shore side of the first buoy. When patient and crew person reach the IRB, the driver assists the patient into the boat, as the tube must remain on the patient's body until they are in the craft. The crew person will climb into the craft and when both are in the boat, the driver must commence an anti-clockwise turn of the buoy before proceeding back to the shore. The finish is much the same as for the Surf Rescue.

The Tube Rescue is a test of the crew person's swimming fitness and strength. The race is very dynamic, often the outcome is determined by which crew person is the stronger swimmer.

=== IRB Relay ===
IRB Relay is a competitive event that requires two IRB teams from each individual club, each consisting of a driver, a crew person and a patient. One is designated the primary team, and the other, the secondary team. Set-up is similar to the Surf Rescue and the primary team starts the race in the same way as the Surf Rescue, racing out to pick up the first patient and then returning to the beach.

As soon as the primary team reaches the beach and the driver exits the boat, the secondary crew person is allowed to run out to the boat, turn it around, and drag it out to starting depth. The two crews must have control of the boat at all times.

While the secondary-team crew person prepares the IRB for its second run, the driver from the primary team sprints up the beach to tag the driver of the secondary team, who then sprints down the beach, enters the boat and then proceeds to pick up the second patient.

The race is complete when the secondary team has successfully returned to the beach, the driver has exited the boat and has run across the finish line.

== Team positions and racing protocol ==
- IRB driver
- IRB crew person
- IRB patient
