= Cronulla District LifeSaver Rescue Service =

Assists surf life saving clubs and organisations

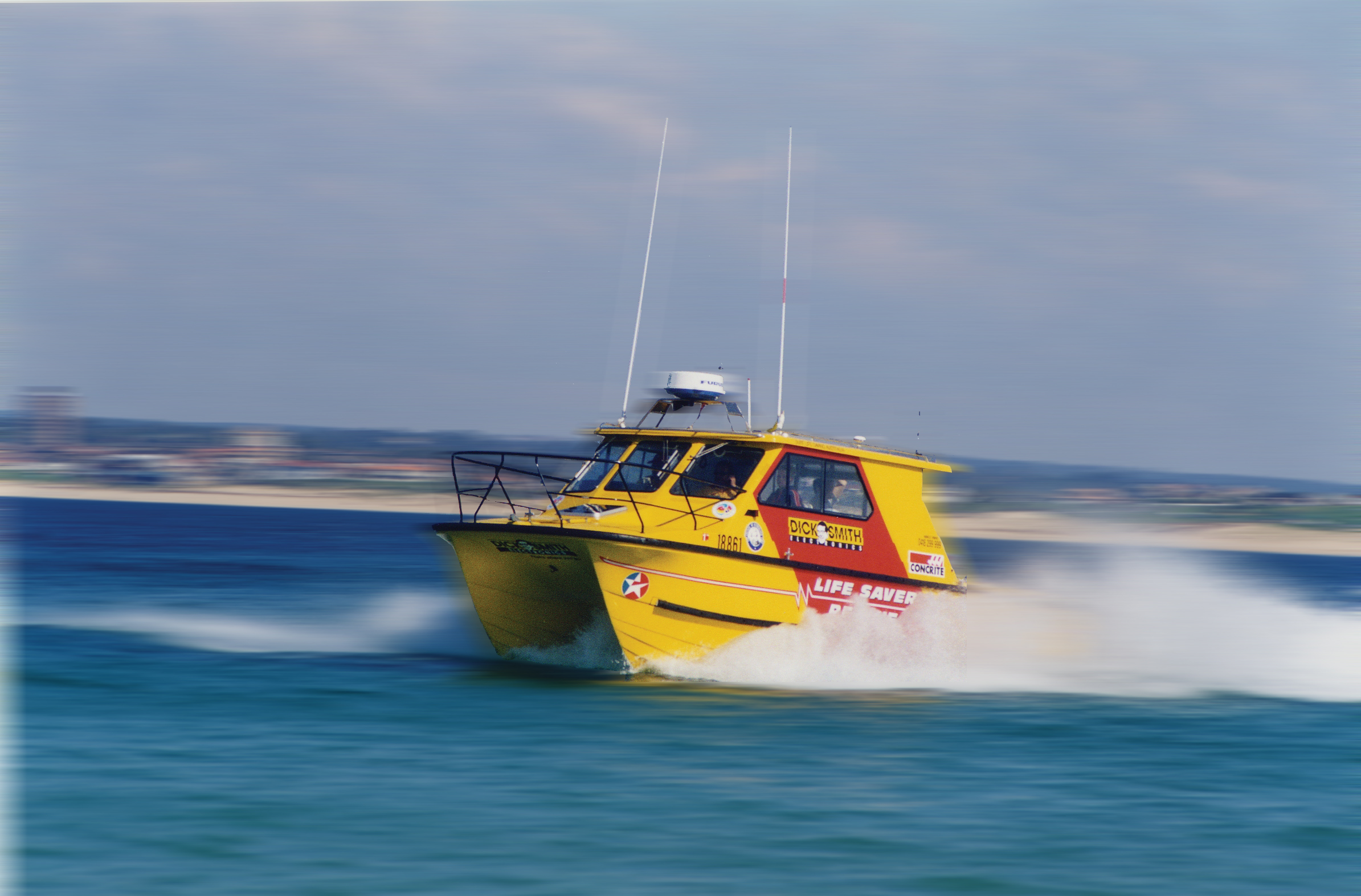
The 'Offshore 2' Rescue Boat responding to a rescue in Bate Bay.

The Cronulla District LifeSaver Rescue Service works with the Water Police, NSW Police, NSW Maritime, Coast Guard, PolAir Helicopters, Westpac Life Saver Rescue Helicopters, Bate Bay Surf Life Saving Clubs as well as clubs in the Royal National Park, and CareFlight helicopters in providing rescue and emergency medical care to the people on Sydney's waterways.

Specialising in ocean rescues, it assists surf life saving clubs and organisations including the water police, from Botany Bay to the southern end of the Royal National Park.

== The rescue boat ==
Offshore 2 is an 8-metre Noosa Cat, popular with rescue crews such as the Water Police around Australia. The hull of the boat is separated into two sections both filled with foam; making it virtually impossible for the vessel to sink.

The boat has an operational time of 10 hours, powered by twin 200 horse power Yamaha engines with two 275 litre fuel tanks. The vessel can reach speeds of up to 100k/h. The rear deck of the boat has a clear operational area of about seven square metres, allowing easy access for boat and helicopter rescue crews. See Westpac Life Saver Rescue Helicopter Service. It is no longer operational.

== Crew ==
=== Skipper ===
A skipper is responsible for communicating with the emergency services and relative authorities. They co-ordinate all rescue operations involving the rescue vessel and its crew. A skipper holds a Bronze Medallion, VHF Radio Operators Certificate, Advanced Resuscitation Certificate, and Senior First Aid Certificate. They are also qualified to drive the rescue vessel and 4WD, as well as act as crew when required.

=== Driver ===
Is responsible for driving the rescue vessel, and are trained to operate the vessel in emergency situations. They are also proficient to act as Rescue Crew if required.

=== Rescue crewperson ===
Is responsible for the rescue process, be it a patient, vessel or search. They are trained for resuscitation, defibrillation, basic medical care; and hold a Bronze Medallion, Advanced Resuscitation certificate, and Senior First Aid Certificate. Additionally Rescue Crew can hold Life Support qualifications, and Defibrillator Operator certificates.

=== Specialist crew ===
A paramedic from the NSW Ambulance Service: Possess elite skills in Advance Life Support (ALS) and trauma management, and rescue techniques. They provide patient care and are responsible for preparing medical missions, coordinating with the Ambulance Service and other medical personnel, and liaising with retrieval services.

== See also ==
- Surf lifesaving
- Surf Life Saving Australia
- List of Australian surf lifesaving clubs
