= Surf lifesaving =

Beach surf lifesaving volunteers

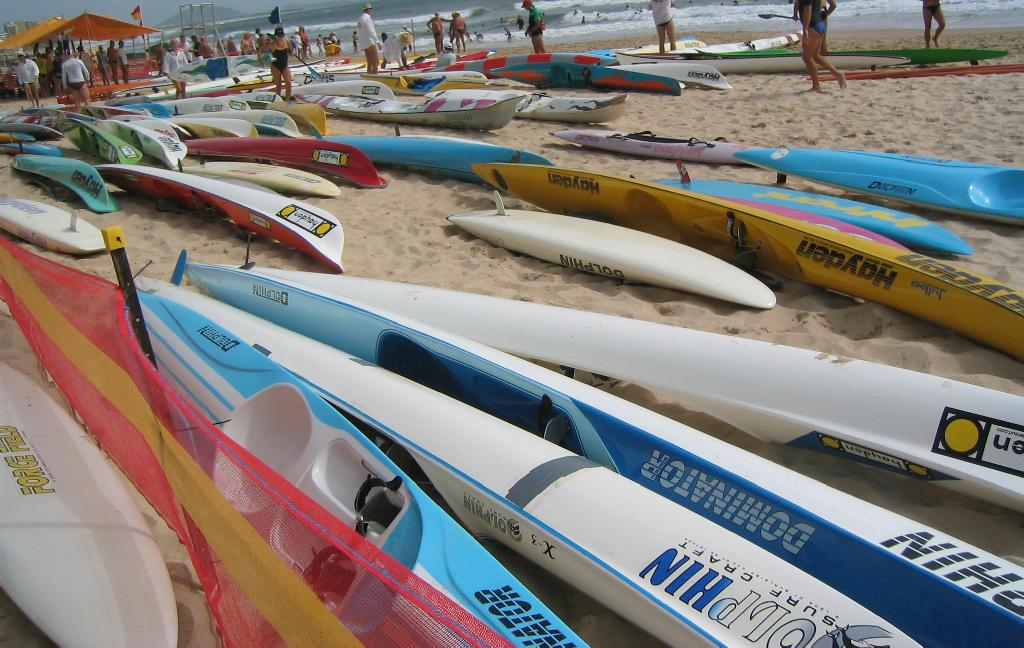
Surf Ski Carnival in Alexandra Heads

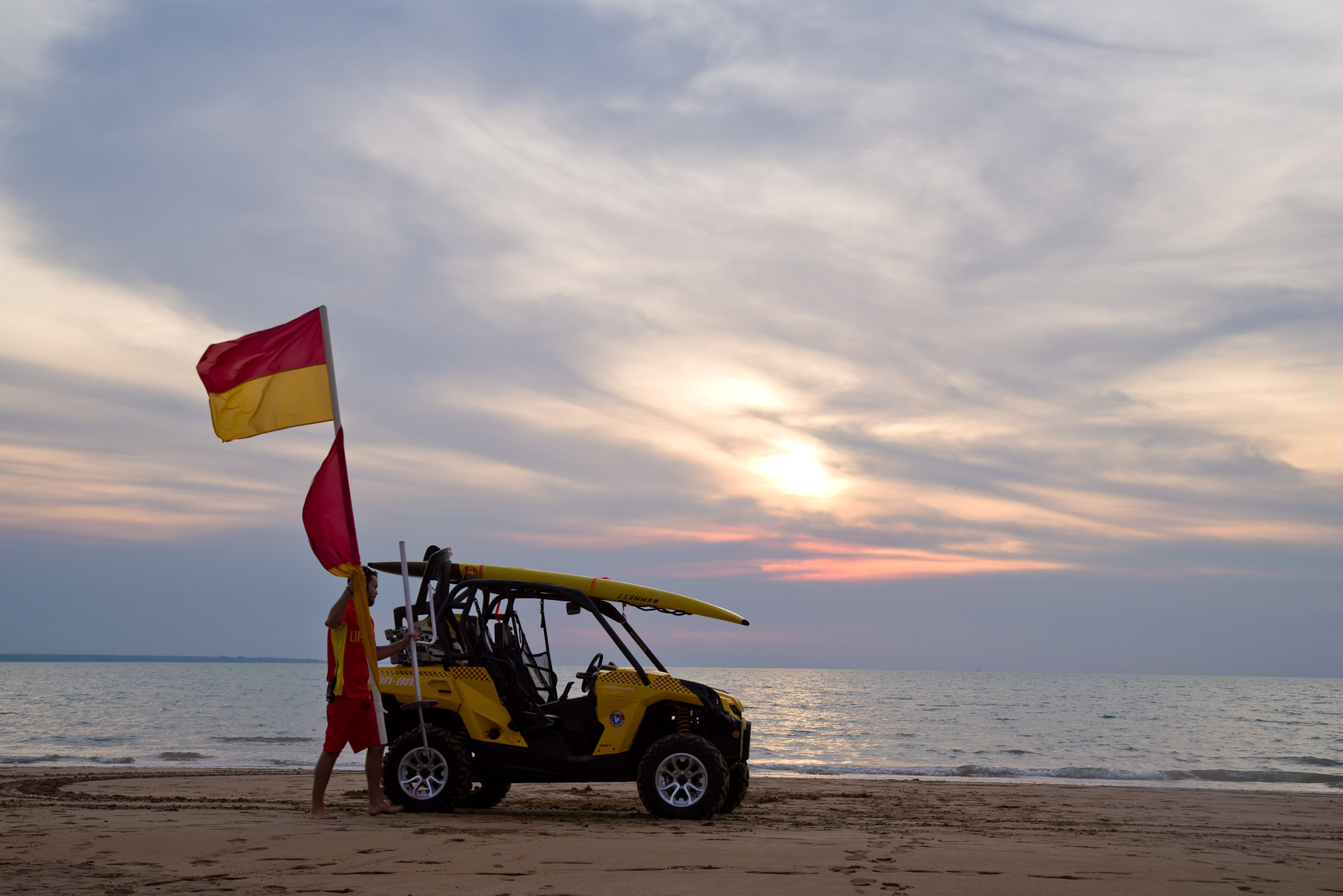
Surf lifesaver taking in the flags at sunset Mindil Beach

Surf lifesaving is a community organisation with several roles that comprises key aspects of voluntary lifeguard services and competitive surf sport. Originating in early 20th century Australia, the movement has expanded globally to other countries, including Ireland, New Zealand, South Africa, and the United Kingdom. Surf lifesavers in Australia are informally called "Clubbies" in Australia.

== History ==
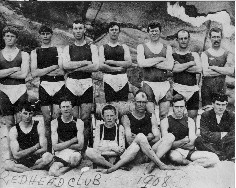
1908 photograph of Redhead Surf Lifesaving Club

Surf lifesaving originated in Australia in 1907 in response to drownings at local beaches in Sydney. Such groups became necessary following the relaxing of laws prohibiting daylight bathing on Australian beaches. Volunteer groups of men were trained in life saving methods and patrolled the beaches as lifesavers looking after public safety.

There had been some debate between Manly Life Saving Club, Bronte Surf Lifesaving Club and Bondi Surf Bathers' Life Saving Club as to which was formed first. After a panel of SLSA historians reviewed all the documentation provided by each club in 2005, SLSA agreed that they recognise Bondi as the first surf life saving club. They stated "A hardy perennial in surf lifesaving history is the question of the first surf club – Bondi or Bronte. As this study has shown, the first group of organised lifesavers formed on Manly Beach in 1899. While moves on Bondi, Bronte and Manly in early 1907 saw the organisation of irregulars, it was the surf bathers of Bondi who first organised themselves as a formal club in February 1907". The Bondi Surf Bathers' Life Saving Club was officially established on 21 February 1907, at the Royal Hotel in Bondi – as was recorded in the newspaper The East Sydney Argus, and in the Waverley Council minutes acknowledging receipt of a letter from the newly formed group.

On 10 October 1907, the Surf Bathing Association of New South Wales (SBANSW) was founded with nine clubs and affiliated associations. The nine "foundation" clubs were the Royal Life Saving Society, Manly Surf Club, Bondi Surf Bathers' Life Saving Club, Coogee Surf Life Brigade (Coogee Surf Life Saving Club), Bronte Surf Brigade (Bronte Surf Lifesaving Club), Bondi Surf and Social Club (North Bondi Surf Life Saving Club), Tamarama Surf Club (later disbanded, however nowadays Tamarama Surf Life Saving Club), Maroubra Surf Club (Maroubra Surf Life Saving Club), United Wanderers Surf Club, and Woollahra Surf Club. The first club outside of Sydney was Kiama Surf Bather's Club, founded in 1908.

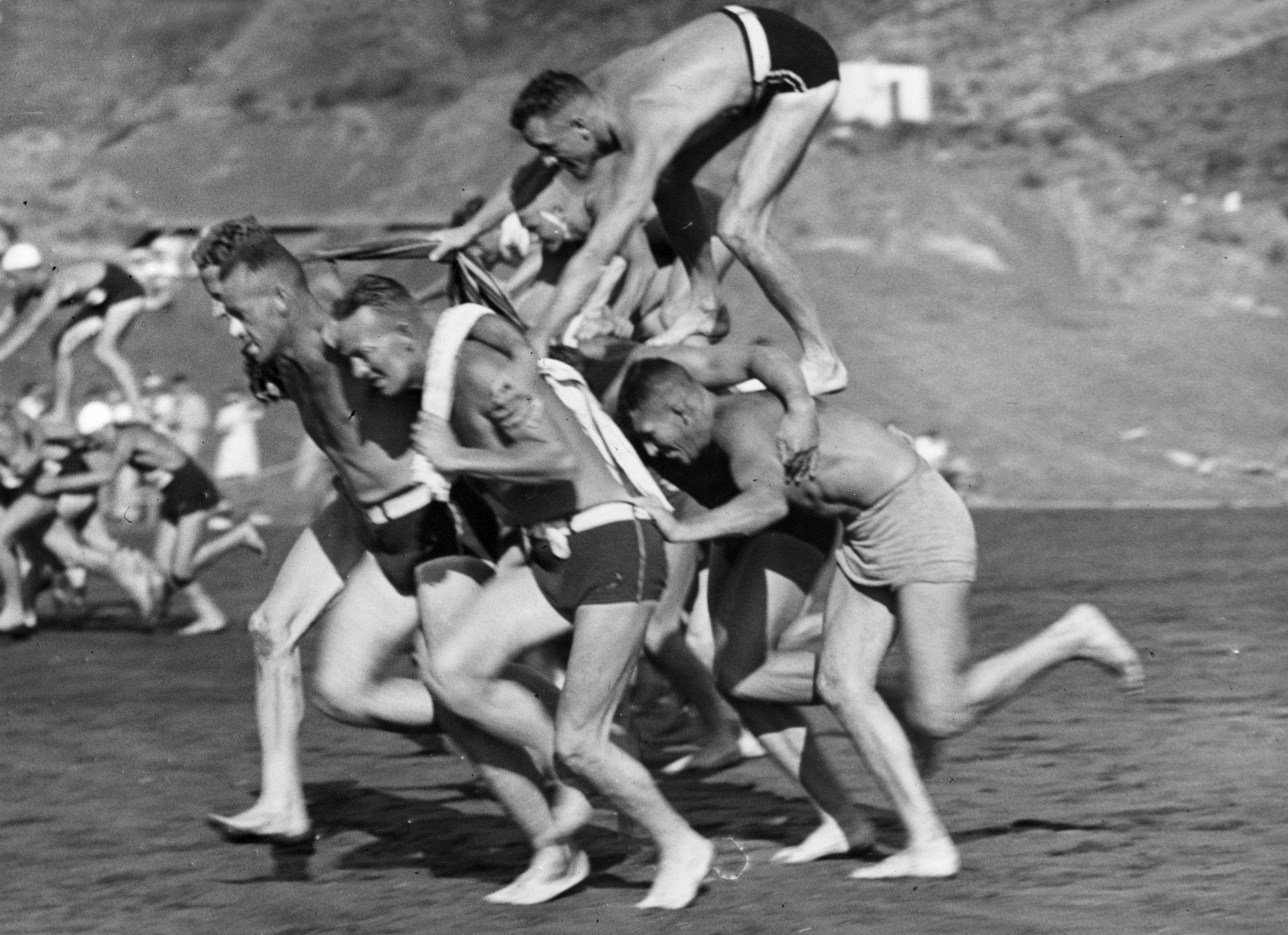
Chariot race, Piha Surf Club carnival, New Zealand c. 1938

The first New Zealand Surf Lifesaving Clubs began in the years 1909 to 1910 leading off with: Castlecliff (Wanganui), Lyall Bay (Wellington), New Brighton (Christchurch) and Worser Bay (Wellington). Within the next few years other clubs started forming around five regions: Wellington, Christchurch, Dunedin, Gisborne/Napier/New Plymouth and Wanganui.

In the northern region, Piha Surf Life Saving Club was founded in 1934 and as such is the oldest club on Auckland's west coast and is the home of Piha Rescue. Soon after the New Zealand clubs were formed, rivalry began to take place which created the forming of competition between the clubs and regions. By early 1912 competitions were being organised by Wellington's Maranui Club, with male members competing in squads of eight. The competitions consisted of a land drill and "reel test". The first New Zealand National Champs where clubs were able to compete was held in 1922.

The Surf Life Saving Great Britain (SLSGB) organisation was formed in 1955. Volunteer clubs patrolled beaches in England at Bude and St. Agnes in Cornwall and at Brighton, their aim to protect, rescue and resuscitate bathers. Voluntary organisations exist in Germany, such as DLRG and Wasserwacht.

== Rescue services ==
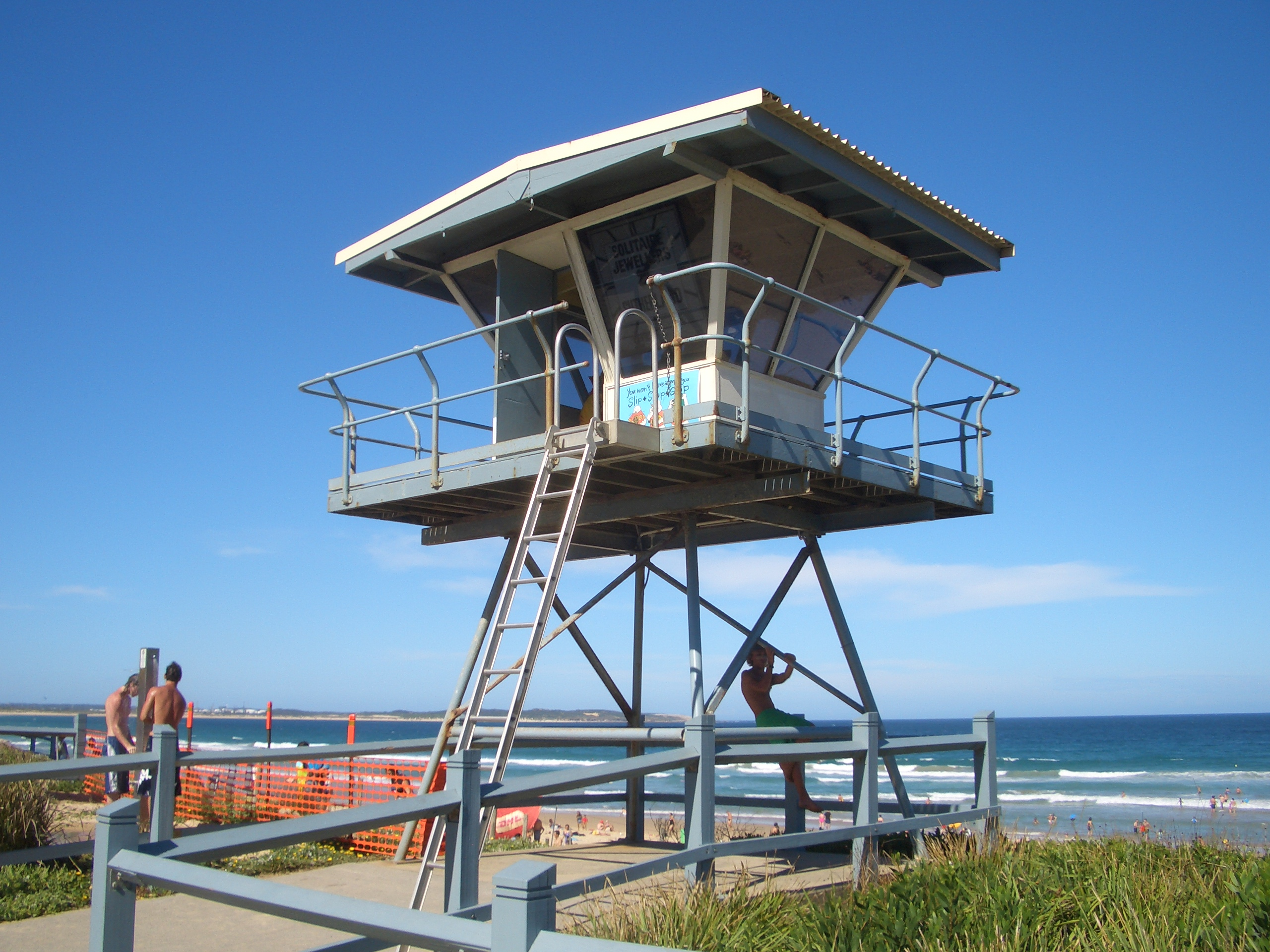
North Cronulla Beach tower

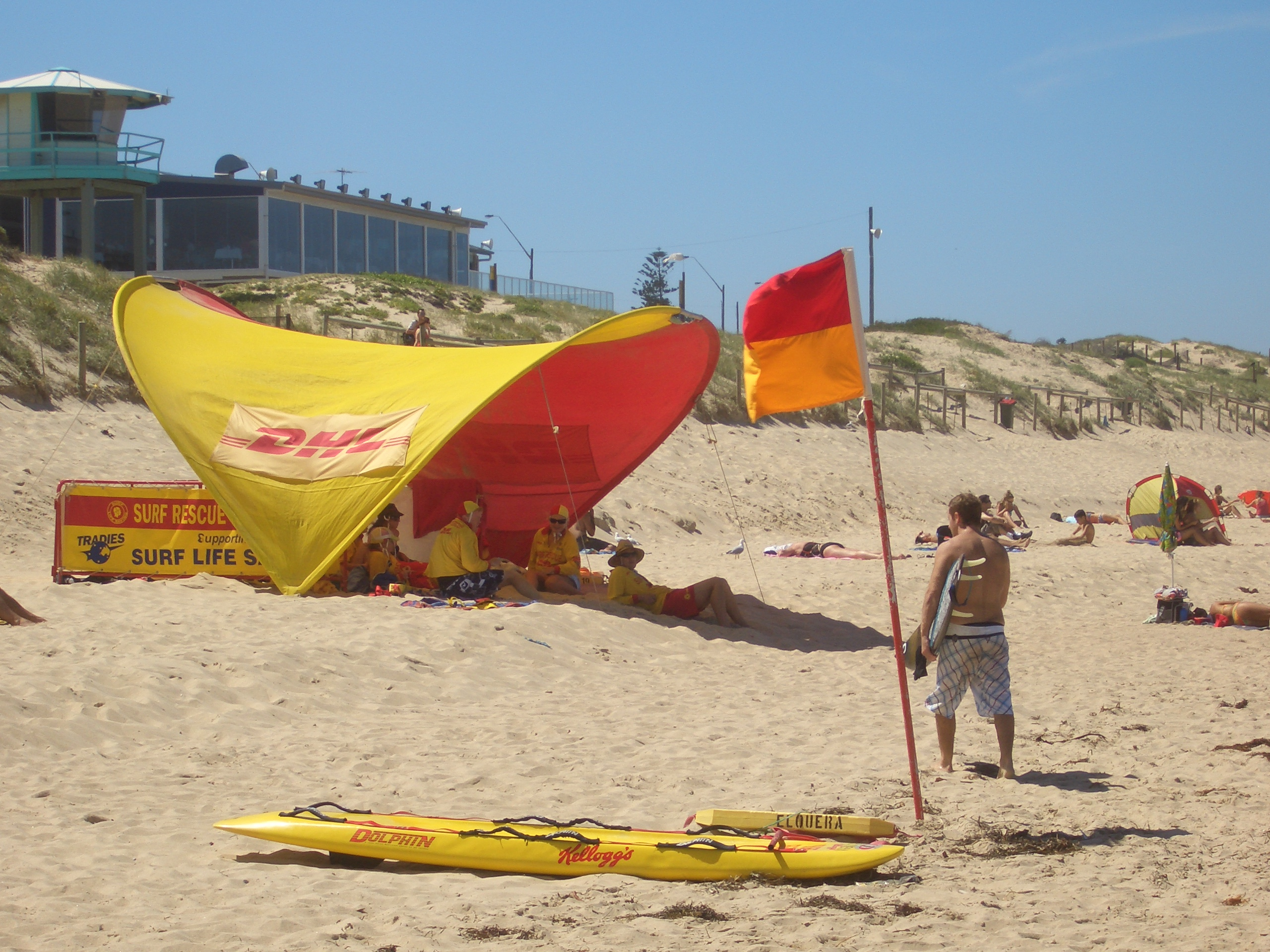
Elouera Beach lifesavers

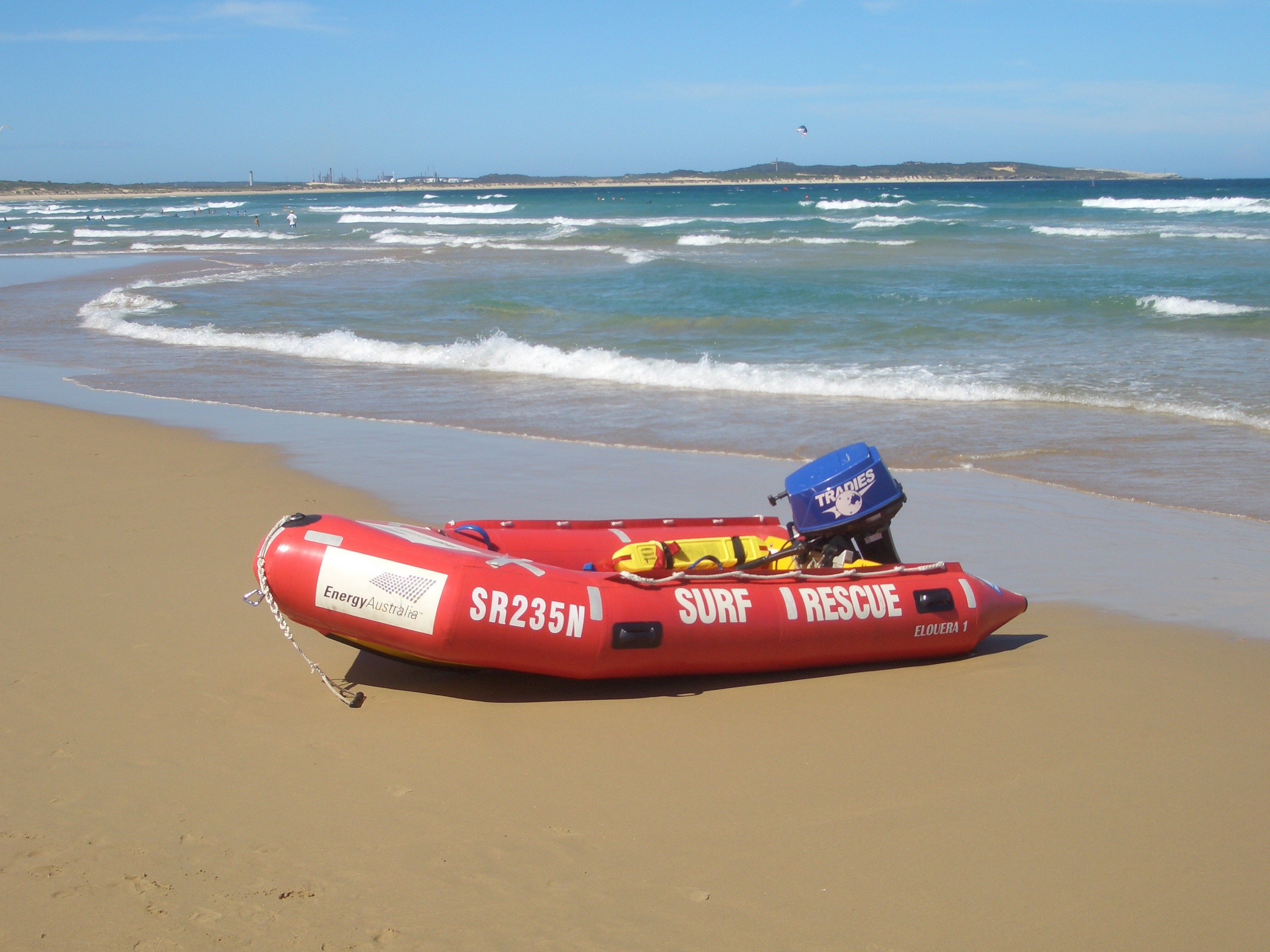
Elouera Beach lifesaving boat

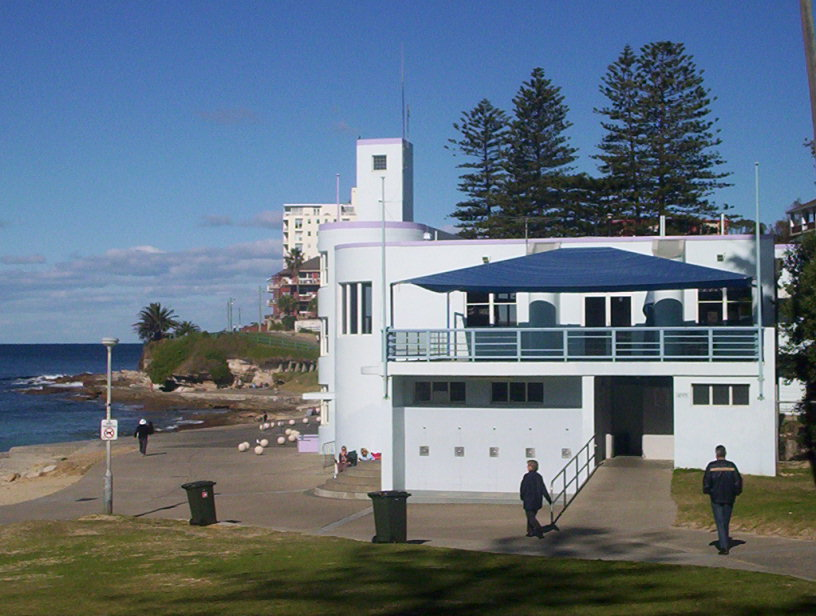
Cronulla Surf Life Saving Club

Lifesavers are volunteers that typically patrol in groups under a patrol captain for a given period of time on weekend and public holidays under a roster system. In order to be a surf lifesaver a person must hold a Bronze Medallion or a Surf Rescue Certificate and pass an annual proficiency test. Lifesavers who are on patrol wear red and yellow cloth caps on the head. While not performing rescues they are also required to wear long-sleeve yellow shirts and red shorts to provide protection against the sun. Lifesavers who help with emergency support operations are required to wear the appropriate functional attire. This includes wetsuits for RWC (Rescue Water Craft) drivers, JRB/ORB (jet and offshore rescue boat) crew and high visibility tabards for duty officers, who liaise with other emergency services at major incidents. The crews of various Lifesaver helicopter services over the country wear appropriate aviation equipment. Each surf life saving club also has a competition cap with distinct colours or patterns. These are worn during competition and for training on the beach. The patrolled area of the beach is marked out with red and yellow flags and beachgoers are encouraged to swim between the flags. Those wishing to use boards, kayaks, or other surfcraft are required to remain outside the flags.

In the UK, SLSGB has a long history of voluntary members patrolling local beaches, offering advice, first aid and rescue services. This continues today and is a vital service to the community. Many local authorities provide a lifeguard service from May to September on popular beaches. In some areas Royal National Lifeboat Institution lifeguards operate on behalf of the local authority.

== Competition ==
The other key part of surf life saving is the competitive sport which evolved from the training activities of lifesavers at Australian and New Zealand surf beaches, though most events share little with modern inflatable rescue boat (IRB) based surf rescue techniques. The sport is still based on volunteer clubs which perform rescue duty, from children in the "nippers" category through to professional elite circuits that have been established for the high-profile "ironman" events. The sport is still mainly in Australia and New Zealand. However, the Nova Scotia Lifeguard Service in Canada has run the Nova Scotia Surf League competitions every summer since 2000, and competition programs exist in five regions of Canada. In Europe the sport is increasingly developed, with Italy, Spain and Germany particularly strong and the UK, the Netherlands and Ireland developing rapidly.

Surf life saving clubs regularly hold surf carnivals where clubs compete with each other in a range of beach- and rescue-oriented events including combined swimming and running, surf ski and surf boat races. The youth arm of the clubs is known as Nippers, and holds similar events.

The various events involve elements of surf swimming, board riding, sand running, mock rescues using rowed surf boats, and paddling special kayak-like surf skis. Some events are for individuals, but many are team events.

Individual surf lifesaving events include:

- Ironman
- Long boat rescue (also called surf boat rescue)
- R&R (rescue & resuscitation)
- March Past
- Beach events (including beach sprints, beach relays, and beach flags)
- Surf ski
- First aid competition, champion lifesaver and patrol competition
- Board events
- IRB racing

Individual surf life saving clubs compete at the state and national levels at the annual State Championships and the Australian Surf Life Saving Championships, also known as the "Aussies", which are the national surf lifesaving championships in Australia. Around 450 events are held over nine days of competition, involving more than 6,000 competitors from Australia and other countries.

== Life saving today ==
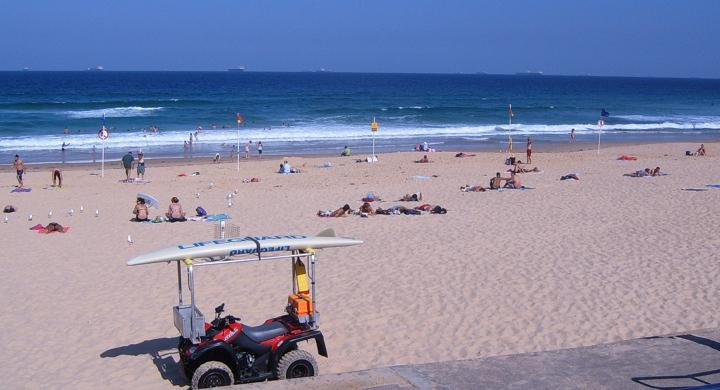
Signs for bathers and surfboard riders at the patrolled section of beach, Newcastle, New South Wales, 2007

Surf lifesaving in Australia is well-developed as both a voluntary lifesaver service and as a competitive sport. There are 314 surf lifesaving clubs in Australia that collectively patrol over 600 beaches. During the 2024/25 season, Surf Life Saving Australia reported 207,962 members nationwide, consisting of approximately 52.5% male members, 47.5% female members, and less than 0.1% non-binary members. According to the 2025 National Coastal Safety Report released by Surf Life Saving Australia, 154 coastal drowning deaths were recorded in Australia during the previous year, the highest number recorded to date. Surf lifesaving services carried out more than 2.19 million preventative actions and performed over 8,200 rescues during the patrol season. The report also estimated that surf lifesavers and lifeguards prevented at least an additional 1,500 coastal drowning deaths through their interventions.

Surf life savers provide important surf rescue services on beaches in Australia on weekends and public holidays throughout the patrol season on a volunteer basis. In New South Wales the season coincides with the beginning of the September school holidays and finishes on ANZAC Day. They also provide year-round on-call volunteer rescue services in most areas known as Support Services.

Lifesavers are distinguished in Australia from paid lifeguards which are generally employed by the relevant Local Government authority and patrol the beach throughout the year. Lifeguards also patrol lakes, pools, and other aquatic venues. Support Services also support the beach patrols by providing surveillance away from the flag areas and emergency backup when required.

== See also ==
- Lifesaving (sport)
- Commonwealth Pool Lifesaving Championships
- International Life Saving Federation
- List of Australian surf lifesaving clubs
- Royal Life Saving Society Australia
- Surf Life Saving Australia
- Surf Life Saving New Zealand
- The Coolangatta Gold
- United States Life-Saving Service
