= Tamarama Surf Life Saving Club =

Tamarama
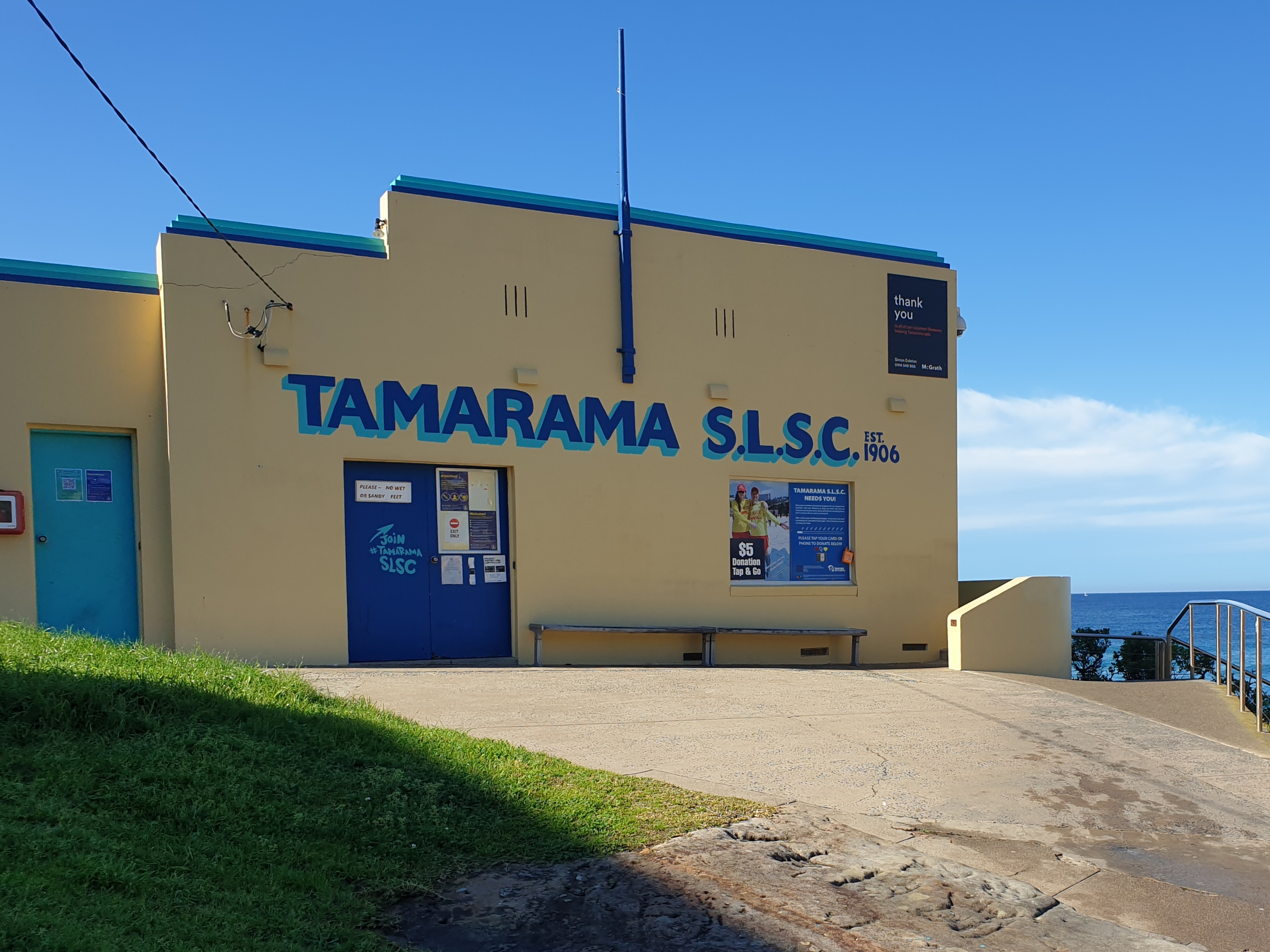
- Full name: Tamarama Surf Life Saving Club
- Founded: 1906; 120 years ago
- Members: 500 senior, 250 junior

The Tamarama Surf Life Saving Club was founded in 1906 and operates at Tamarama Beach, Sydney. The clubhouse sits at the northern end of the beach.

The club was formed after a dispute between local beach-goers and the operator of an amusement park, Wonderland City, on the beachfront. The operator erected a fence to prohibit access to the amusement park from the beach, but the fence had the effect of obstructing public access to the beach. The surfers and swimmers prevailed when the New South Wales government declared the beach to be public land, and some of them subsequently formed the surf life saving club.

Tamarama Beach has a reputation for danger, due to its strong rip currents. Surf Life Saving New South Wales regards it as the state's most dangerous patrolled beach. However, there has never been a death at the beach while it has been patrolled.

== See also ==
- Surf lifesaving
- Surf Life Saving Australia
- List of Australian surf lifesaving clubs
