= The East Sydney Argus =

Australian newspaper

The East Sydney Argus was a newspaper published in Sydney, New South Wales, Australia.

== History ==
The first edition was published on Wednesday, 10 June 1903 to cover the Municipalities of Paddington, Randwick, Vaucluse, Waverley, Woollahra, and the Eastern State and Federal Electorates. It is believed to have closed in 1907.
