= Bronze Medallion (Australia and New Zealand) =

Lifesaving standard award

The Bronze Medallion, signifying a qualified lifesaver, has been a lifesaving standard award of the Royal Life Saving Society - Australia and Surf Life Saving Australia for over one hundred years. It was developed in England in 1892. It has evolved over the years to accommodate the environmental conditions of Australia.

In Australia and New Zealand, one must gain a Bronze Medallion to become a qualified Life Saver.

== Testing and exams ==
The qualifying test to become a Life Saver includes both theoretical and practical components although assessment conditions can vary form region to region.

== Theoretical ==
This includes:

- Resuscitation (CPR)
- First Aid
- Signals
- Communication/radios
- Workbook
- Exam

== Practical ==
- Timed 400m swim (100m of freestyle, survival backstroke, sidestroke and breaststroke) in less than 13 minutes in either a 25 or 50m pool

(Or open water course for surf lifesaving)

- Timed rescue tow, swimming 50m to a patient and towing them back within 3 min 15 seconds
- Survival and rescue skills, demonstrating a range of survival techniques and appropriate rescues for a range of different aquatic environments and scenarios
- Demonstrating basic management of a suspected spinal injury in shallow water
- Rescue initiative demonstrating initiative in affecting a rescue of two people who are in difficulty up to 15 metres from safety.
- Resuscitation, demonstrating effective CPR and DRSABCD.

== Requirements ==
- Must be within one calendar year of turning 14
- 400m swim in less than 13 minutes (freestyle, can be in pools greater than 25m)
- You must perform a tube and a board rescue
- You must demonstrate putting a patient in the recovery position
- You must demonstrate CPR
- You must demonstrate radio communication & first aid Pass an oral test on First Aid as well as all Surf Lifesaving practices.

== The Bronze Medallion ==
The Bronze Medallion has been issued in New Zealand in a number of styles. The following types have been issued. The numbering is arbitrary and other types may exist.

Type 1. c. 1910.

Obverse: Two swimmers in the water, one rescuing the other. The head and upper body of the person being rescued is visible but the figures of the people are not very clearly defined. In the background is an indistinct shore. Around the edge in a sans-serif font are the words "THE ROYAL LIFE SAVING SOCIETY ESTABLISHED 1891"

Reverse: Around the edge in the same sans-serif font are the words "QUEMCUNQUE MISERUM VEDERIS HOMINEM SCIAS" which may be translated as ‘Whomsoever you see in distress, recognize him as a fellow man.’ In the centre in two lines in a roman font are the words "AWARDED TO" followed by a space in which the recipient’s name and the date of awarding were added. The medallion is 32.5mm in diameter and nearly 3mm thick. It has a loop at the top for a ribbon suspension.

Type 2. c. 1916.

Obverse: Two swimmers in the water – one rescuing the other, one with his/her hands on the side of the head of the second person. Only the heads can be seen. In the background are some hills, trees, and clouds. Otherwise details as Type 1. The medallion is 30mm in diameter and about 2.5mm thick. It has a loop at the top for a ribbon suspension.

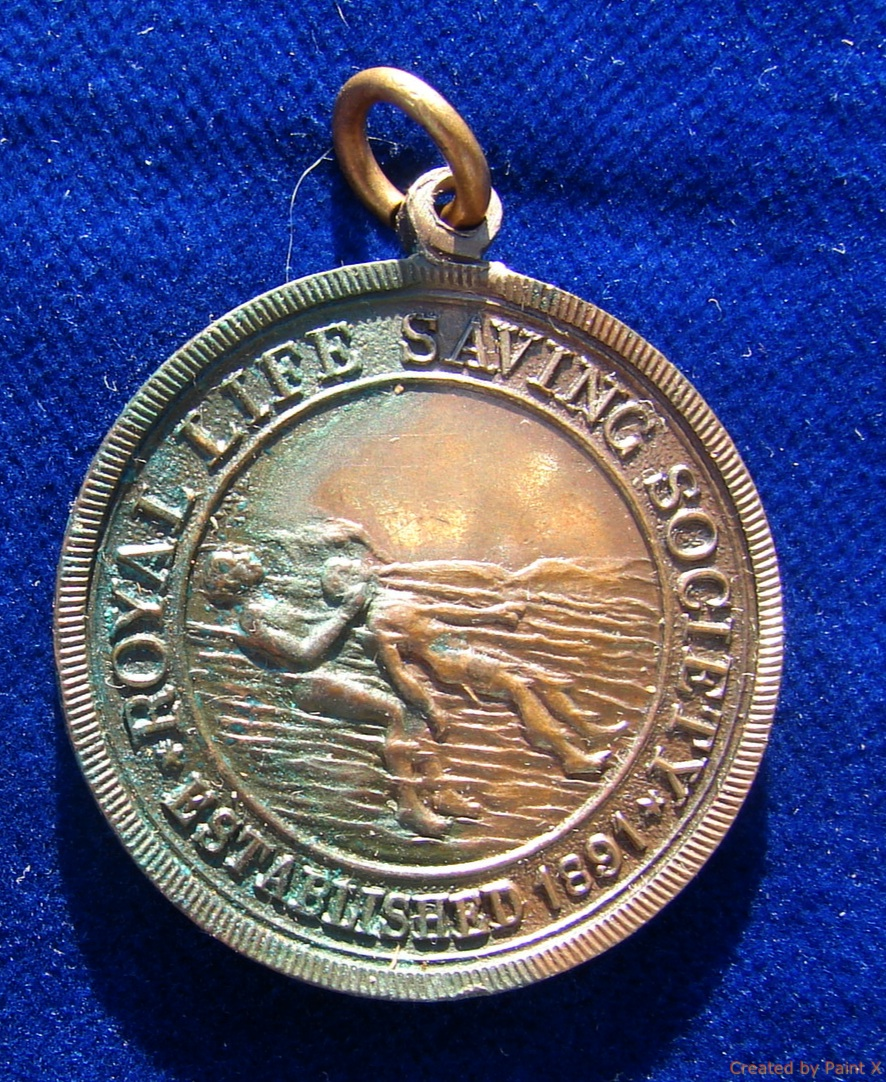
NZ & AUS Royal Life Saving Medal Awarded 1934, obverse

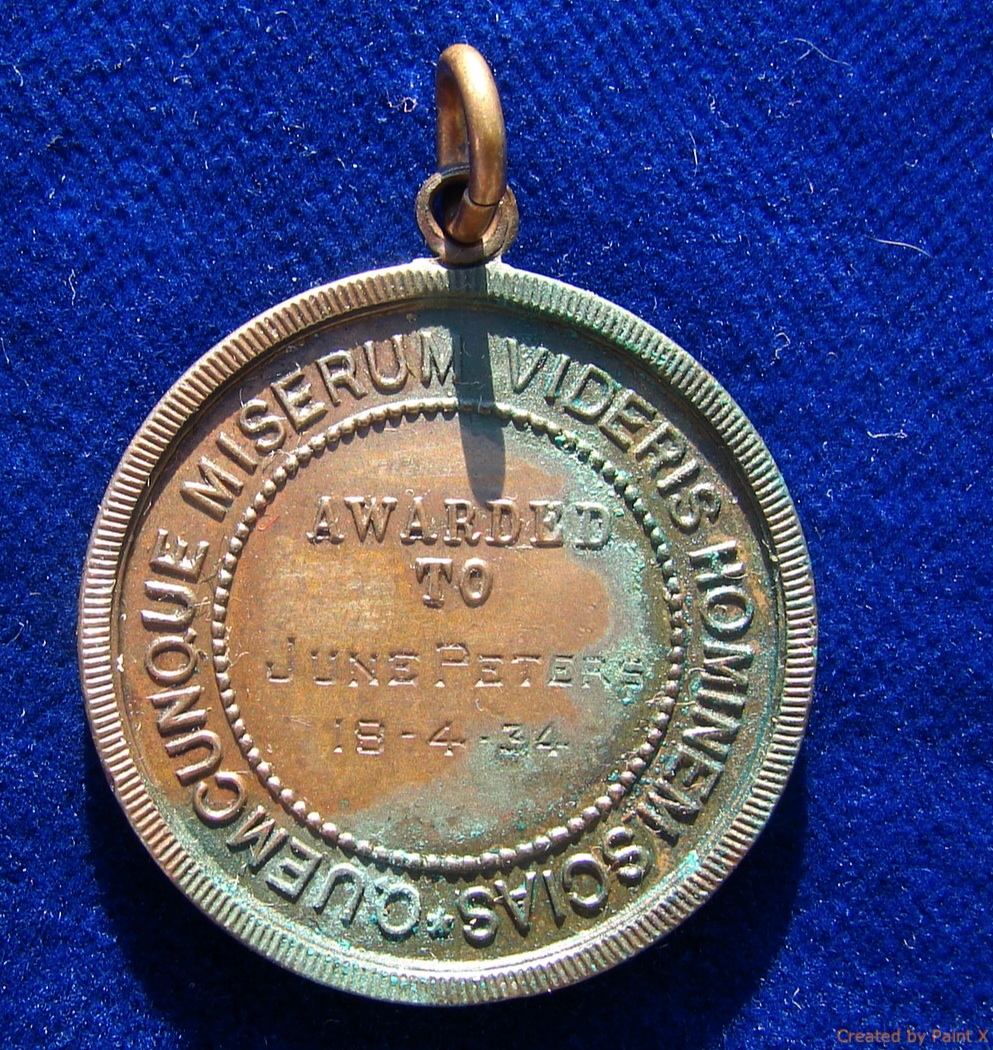
NZ & AUS Royal Life Saving Medal Awarded 1934, reverse

Type 3. c. 1930.

Obverse: Two swimmers in the water – one rescuing the other, one with his/her hands on the side of the head of the second person. The whole bodies of both swimmers are clearly seen. The background shore is indistinct. Otherwise details as Type 1 but the wording is in a roman font. Edge of this side has a milled pattern. Reverse. As Type 1 and the edge has a milled pattern. Organization name changed to "ROYAL LIFE SAVING SOCIETY". Size is 30mm diameter and 2.5mm thick. With loop for ribbon suspension.

Type 3A. c. 1928.

As Type 3 but with the words "FOR LIFE SAVING SKILL WITH SURF LIFE LINE" on the reverse in a sans-serif font.

Type 3B. c. 1934.

As Type 3 but 3mm thick. See images.

Type 3C. c. 1937.

As Type 3 but 32.5mm diameter and 3mm thick. Oddly, the "LI" of "ESTABLISHED" is in a slightly larger sized font.

Type 4 c. 1940-47.

Obverse: Instead of swimmers the central part consists of a crossed boat hook and oar forming quadrants. In the centre is a clover form made from rope, Around this item are the words "ROYAL LIFE SAVING SOCIETY" in a sans-serif font. The word "LIFE" is uppermost. Around the edge in the same sans-serif font are the words "QUEMCUNQUE MISERUM VEDERIS HOMINEM SCIAS" as in Type 1 reverse.

Reverse: Around the edge in a roman font are the words "ROYAL LIFE SAVING SOCIETY" and in a smaller size "ESTABLISHED 1891" In the centre in two lines in a roman font are the words "AWARDED TO" followed by a space in which the recipient’s name and the date of awarding were added. Size 32mm diameter and about 3mm thick. With loop for ribbon suspension. For a photograph of the medallion see Royal Life Saving Society UK.

Type 4A c. 1954.

Very similar to Type 4 but the centre clover shape is flat rather than rounded. Also slightly different oar and boat hook. Slightly smaller at just under 32mm in diameter.

Type 5 c. 1960.

Almost the same as Type 4 but the reverse has "ROYAL LIFE SAVING SOCIETY" in a sans-serif font. In a smaller size in a roman font is "ESTABLISHED 1891" The numbers are in ranging style. i.e. the tail of the ‘9’ drops below the baseline of the other numbers. Size otherwise the same but slightly under 2mm thick.

Type 6 c. 1970–present.

A small version of the obverse of Types 4 & 5 but it is uniface only, that is the reverse is plain although sometimes the recipient's name is added there. It is 25mm in diameter.

=== Ribbons ===
Some of these medallions were issued with ribbons. The very earliest ones, c 1910, were just a plain darkish blue ribbon. Later ones were a grey-blue ground with a thin central white strip and a thin dark blue strip on either side. There is sometimes attached at the top of the ribbon a clasp containing a bar with "R. L. S. S." Additionally another bar may be placed centrally with the then current season years on it. e.g. "1961-62" (A southern hemisphere season crosses two calendar years.)

Other Royal Life Saving Society medals or medallions exist such as the Intermediate Star, the Award of Merit, (early ones in hallmarked silver) and the Bronze Cross
