= Nova Scotia Lifeguard Service =

Canadian lifeguard service

The Nova Scotia Lifeguard Service (also NSLS) is a Canadian lifeguard service operating in Nova Scotia.

NSLS has been supervising many Nova Scotian beaches since 1973 and is a joint project between the Nova Scotia Department of Health Promotion and Protection, and the Nova Scotia Branch of the Royal Life Saving Society of Canada (RLSSC) .

The NSLS employed 54 full-time lifeguards for the 2006 season, as well as several other part-time staff. Supervision seasons typically run from July 1 through to the last weekend in August, with a few beaches continuing weekend supervision into September. The NSLS developed the Nova Scotia Surf League, Canada's first surf lifesaving competition series, and has seen several Nova Scotians selected to the Core Team of the Canadian National Lifesaving Team since its inception.

The service was born out of a 1972 study into a high number of drownings at public beaches in Nova Scotia. Originally called the Nova Scotia Beach Supervision Project, the beaches were organized by region, so that each region is required to recruit and hire lifeguards for the beaches, thereby supplying lifeguard supervision. The program was centralized and began employing a full-time director in 1975, when it also changed its name to the Nova Scotia Lifeguard Service.

In 2019, the NSLS supervised 23 beaches around the province and was responsible for training and administration services for several others.

== Supervised beaches ==
- Aylesford Lake Beach (Municipality of Kings County)
- Bayfield Beach (Municipality of the County of Antigonish)
- Bayswater Beach (Lunenburg County, Nova Scotia)
- Dollar Lake Beach (Dollar Lake Provincial Park)
- Dominion Beach (Cape Breton Regional Municipality)
- Heather Beach (Heather Beach Provincial Park)
- Ingonish Beach (Cape Breton Regional Municipality)
- Inverness Beach (Municipality of the County of Inverness)
- Lake Ellenwood Beach (Lake Ellenwood Provincial Park)
- Lake Milo Beach (Municipality of the District of Yarmouth)
- Lawrencetown Beach (Lawrencetown Beach Provincial Park)
- Martinique Beach (Halifax County, Nova Scotia
- Mavilette Beach (Municipality of the District of Clare)
- Melmerby Beach (Melmerby Beach Provincial Park)
- Mira Gut Beach (Cape Breton Regional Municipality)
- Point Michaud Beach (Cape Breton Regional Municipality)
- Pomquet Beach (Pomquet Beach Provincial Park)
- Port Hood Beach (Municipality of the County of Inverness)
- Port Maitland Beach (Port Maitland Provincial Park)
- Queensland Beach (Queensland Beach Provincial Park)
- Rainbow Haven Beach (Rainbow Haven Provincial Park)
- Rissers Beach (Rissers Beach Provincial Park)

== Training ==
Lifeguards employed with the NSLS must complete a physically rigorous selection process.

All lifeguard applicants to NSLS must be certified with the RLSSC's National Lifeguard Service Award and also maintain certification in Standard First Aid as well as cardiopulmonary resuscitation (CPR) level C.

Applicants are then tested with a timed 500-meter swim in surf conditions, followed by a timed 3.2 km run, and a timed 50-meter carry with a suitably weighted mannequin.

The physical test is followed by a written test. Should an applicant be hired, s/he must successfully complete a four-day NSLS training camp with all new and returning lifeguards immediately prior to the start of the supervision season, during which there are further evaluations of skills based on performance during mock emergency scenarios. Should an applicant not meet the standard during the training camp, alternates who are successful will be selected in their place.

== Nova Scotia Surf League ==
Nova Scotia Surf League is a lifeguard competition operated by NSLS. Started in 2000, it is Canada's first lifesaving competition series. The format of the series was modeled after an Australian professional lifesaving circuit called the Nutri-Grain Surf League. It has aimed to focus on increasing the level of participation among in the sport of lifesaving among Nova Scotia lifeguards, mainly through providing regular access to competition. The league founder, Craig Durling, remains active today as the league's Commissioner.

Prior to the existence of Surf League, Nova Scotians would often travel to competitions in Ontario, Quebec and the United States.

At the conclusion of each summer, league awards are presented to the top teams and individuals who competed on the series. Career statistics are also maintained by the league for wins for men and women.
