= Frederick Lucas (disambiguation) =

Frederick Lucas (1812–1855) was a British journalist.

Frederick Lucas may also refer to:

- Buddy Lucas (swimmer) (Frederick Ross Lucas, 1931–2002), New Zealand swimmer
- Fred Lucas (baseball) (Frederick Warrington Lucas, 1903–1987), American Major League Baseball player
- Sir Frederick Cook, 2nd Baronet (Frederick Lucas Cook, 1844–1920), British politician
- Frederic Augustus Lucas (1852–1929), American anatomist and museum director
- Frederick Lucas (Sussex cricketer) (1860–1887), English cricketer
- Fred Lucas (footballer) (Frederick Charles Lucas, 1933–2015), English footballer and cricketer for Kent
- Fred Lucas (aviator) (Frederick John Lucas, 1915–1993), New Zealand aviator, farmer and tourist operator
- Fred Lucas (rugby union) (Frederick William Lucas, 1902–1957), New Zealand rugby union player
