= Buddy Lucas =

Buddy Lucas may refer to:

- Buddy Lucas (swimmer) (1931–2002), New Zealand swimmer
- Buddy Lucas (musician) (1914–1983), American jazz saxophonist
