= Surf Life Saving Northern Region =

Life saving club in New Zealand

Surf Life Saving Northern Region is the largest of four regions that make up Surf Life Saving New Zealand. As of the 2021/2022 season, it is made up of 18 clubs that look after 22 patrol locations from Ahipara to Raglan on the West Coast and from Whangārei Heads to Takapuna on the East Coast.

The organisation currently employs 16 full-time staff as well as more than 100 seasonal roles in the Volunteer Lifeguard Service, Paid Lifeguard Service, Community Education and Search and Rescue Services.

== Clubs & Patrol Locations ==
There are currently 22 patrol locations and 18 clubs in Surf Life Saving Northern Region. Season lengths vary from three weeks to 28 weeks depending on beach user numbers and the level of risk.

1. Paripari Beach, Ahipara - Far North Surf Rescue, founded in 1989.
2. Baylys Beach - Surf Life Saving Baylys Beach, founded in 2021.
3. Ocean Beach - Whangārei Heads Volunteer Surf Life Saving Patrol, founded in 1968.
4. Ruakākā Beach - Ruakākā Surf Life Saving Patrol, founded in 1960.
5. Waipu Cove - Waipu Cove Surf Life Saving Club, founded in 1930.
6. Mangawhai Heads - Mangawhai Heads Volunteer Lifeguard Service, founded in 1963.
7. Omaha Beach - Omaha Surf Life Saving Club, founded in 1989.
8. Orewa - Orewa Surf Life Saving Club, founded in 1951.
9. Red Beach - Red Beach Surf Life Saving Club, founded in 1953.
10. Mairangi Bay - Mairangi Bay Surf Life Saving Club, founded in 1954.
11. Muriwai - Muriwai Volunteer Lifeguard Service, founded in 1948.
12. Te Henga (Bethells Beach) - Bethells Beach Surf Life Saving Patrol, founded in 1958.
13. North Piha - United North Piha Lifeguard Service, founded in 1951.
14. South Piha - Piha Surf Life Saving Club, founded in 1934.
15. Karekare Beach - Karekare Surf Life Saving Patrol Incorporated, founded in 1935.
16. Karioitahi Beach - Surf Life Saving Kariaotahi, founded in 1968.
17. Sunset Beach, Port Waikato - Sunset Beach Lifeguard Service, founded in 1957.
18. Ngarunui Beach, Raglan - Raglan Surf Life Saving Club, founded in 1973.

=== Secondary Patrol Locations ===
- Pākiri Beach - Red Beach Surf Life Saving Club
- Wenderholm - Orewa Surf Life Saving Club
- Long Bay - Mairangi Bay Surf Life Saving Club
- Takapuna - Mairangi Bay Surf Life Saving Club

=== Historic Clubs ===
- Oneroa Surf Club (1930–1932)
- Waitematā Surf Club (1932–1957)
- North Shore Surf Club (1932–1939)
- Milford Girls Surf Club (1932-Unknown)
- Browns Bay Surf Club (1933–1934)
- Eastern United Surf Club (1934–1974)
- Blockhouse Bay Surf Club (1938–1943)
- Ponsonby Surf Club (1940-Unknown)
- Navy Surf Life Saving Club (1956–1960)

=== Historic Patrol Locations ===
- Oneroa, Waiheke Island - last patrolled by Oneroa Surf Club in 1932 and later Waitematā Surf Club in 1957.
- Blockhouse Bay - last patrolled by Blockhouse Bay Surf Club in 1943.
- Mission Bay - last patrolled by Waitematā Surf Club in 1957.
- Kohimarama - last patrolled by Waitematā Surf Club in 1957.
- Motuihe Island - last patrolled by Navy SLSC in 1960.
- Torbay - last patrolled by Eastern United in 1974.
- Matapouri - last patrolled by Whangārei Heads VSLSP in 2009
- Tāwharanui - last patrolled by the Northern Region Paid Lifeguard Service in 2016.
- Brown's Bay - last patrolled by the Northern Region Paid Lifeguard Service in 2018.
- Milford Beach - last patrolled by the Northern Region Paid Lifeguard Service in 2018.

== Volunteer Lifeguard Service ==
The Volunteer Lifeguard Service in Northern Region is made up of 18 clubs that generally patrol their beaches on weekends from Labour Weekend in October to Easter Weekend in April, although a few clubs patrol until Anzac Weekend depending on the conditions and number of beachgoers.

The VLS also incorporates SLSNR's Rescue Water Craft programme, Event Lifeguarding and Patrol Advocates and is managed by the Lifesaving Support Officer.

Surf Life Saving Northern Region also assists with the provision of lifesaving courses for volunteer members, an area managed by the Training and Development Officer.

=== Rescue Water Craft ===
Rescue Water Craft are jet skis operated by some of Surf Life Saving's most skilled lifeguards. They are able to respond quickly to in-water incidents and also conduct roving patrols in their geographical region.

Following recommendations made in the 2020 Support Services Review, RWCs were moved from being a regional support service to a patrol operations asset with SLSNR helping to facilitate training opportunities and fill gaps in club patrol rosters with members of the regional RWC team.

=== Event Lifeguarding ===
The SLSNR Event Lifeguarding team provide water safety, first aid and course set-up/pack down duties at sporting and lifesaving events. They operate mainly on the water in IRB's along with a team coordinator on the beach. The team's primary roles are setting the race courses and ensuring all participant safety while in/on the water. It is a chance to further develop and diversify your lifeguard skills and improve IRB driving. Skilled First Aiders are an important part of the team who are first responders to incidents during events.

=== Patrol Advocates ===
Patrol Advocates work with clubs throughout the season to ensure they are meeting the expected minimum standards set down by Surf Life Saving New Zealand.

Patrol Advocates are a liaison point for clubs who need assistance from Northern Region for equipment, training and information.

Prior to 2020, Patrol Advocates were known as Patrol Auditors. The name was changed following a membership review which recommended a more constructive approach to the auditing process.

== Paid Lifeguard Service ==
The Northern Region Paid Lifeguard Service runs from the first week of December to the first week of March and is managed by the Paid Lifeguard Supervisor.

Over the peak season four Seasonal Paid Lifeguard Supervisors assist in the management and training of PLS lifeguards, with each covering a different section of the region: Northland, East Coast Auckland, West Coast Auckland and Waikato.

While volunteer lifeguards patrol most weekends during the summer, the Paid Lifeguard Service patrol weekdays and some public holidays such as Christmas and New Years. Paid lifeguards also work on weekends at locations not patrolled by volunteers such as on Auckland's East Coast.

The Paid Lifeguard Service employs around 100 lifeguards in seasonal roles stationed at 22 locations around the region. Prerequisites include a high level of fitness, good lifesaving knowledge and current qualifications in First Aid, IRB crewing and an NZ recognised drivers license - restricted or higher.

== Community Education ==
Northern Region's Community Education programme provides water-and beach safety education in Northland, Auckland and Waikato. It is managed by Northern Region's Community Education Manager.

=== Beach Education ===
Beach Education is a practical and theoretical programme run by Surf Life Saving instructors at beaches throughout the region. It teaches young people how to be safe near and in the water, and what to do if anything goes wrong.

=== Surf to School ===
Surf Lifeguard Instructors bring the Surf to School trailer into schools around the region and deliver water and beach safety messages through interactive presentations and activities. Schools are able to book sessions through the Surf Life Saving Northern Region website

=== City Nippers ===
An Auckland-based course designed to build children's confidence in the water and at the beach. The courses consist of five two-hour sessions delivered by Surf Life Saving instructors.

== Search and Rescue Services ==
Northern Region's Search and Rescue services are designed to support and enhance lifesaving activity on the beaches and are managed by the Search and Rescue supervisor.

=== Search and Rescue Squads ===
There are 18 Search and Rescue Squads in Northern Region that are registered with SLSNZ and the NZ Police. They are able to be tasked 24/7 through SurfCom to incidents occurring at beaches or along the coastline in their local area.

SAR Squads are made up of senior lifeguards from each of SLSNR's 18 clubs, with the club's SAR Coordinator responsible for organising regular training opportunities and ensuring all members meet SLSNZ's minimum standards.

=== SurfCom ===
SurfCom is a 24/7 service based out of the Auckland Marine Rescue centre. Its main role is to provide Search and Rescue coordination for surf lifeguards and to act as the communications link between Surf Life Saving Northern Region and other emergency services.

SurfCom Operators are responsible for tasking assets during an incident including Surf Life Saving patrols, emergency callout squads, rescue water craft, duty officers, peer supporters and other emergency agencies. Operators also monitor incident information coming through its communication applications and keep a detailed log of all notable interactions.

SurfCom monitors the region's Radio Network and ensures Surf Life Saving procedures and minimum standards are being met. Operators process patrol information collected over the radio or the Surf Patrol App and use this to identify beaches that may be in breach of their Patrol Operating Manual or may struggle to meet demand, such as those with low numbers of lifeguards but high beach-user numbers. They are then able to organise additional support for these patrols to ensure they meet the necessary standards.

SurfCom manages initial inquiries from media and members of the public and package incident information for press releases. It also monitors weather and water-quality updates to ensure lifeguards and the beach-going public are kept safe and up to date about the best places to swim. Operators update Auckland Council's Safeswim website to notify the public of hazards at patrolled beaches such as large swells, strong currents, high winds, jellyfish, sharks or sea lice.

=== Duty officers ===
The duty officer service is made up of some of Northern Region's most skilled lifeguards, who lend their knowledge and experience to SurfCom and patrols during major incidents.

==== Alpha 1 ====
Alpha 1 is the operational call sign for the duty officer based in the Auckland Marine Rescue Centre. Their main role is to support SurfCom Operators and patrols to carry out their duties. During major incidents, the Alpha 1 liaises with other emergency services in the operations room to develop search and rescue plans.

The Alpha 1 is responsible for ensuring lifesaving activity is carried out in accordance with national and regional procedures and for keeping member welfare at the forefront of decision making. They can also act as the media spokesperson for operational matters.

==== Delta 1 ====
Delta 1 Northern is the operational call sign for the duty officer rostered as first-responder in Northern Region. If a major incident occurs, the Delta 1 can be tasked to support a patrol and be used as a sounding board for a Patrol Captain to bounce ideas off. They also handle on-scene media inquiries, run debriefs and coordinate Peer Support.

During the summer season, Delta 1s travel the region visiting volunteer clubs to build rapport, deliver training and discuss operational updates.

==== Delta 2 ====
If a major incident occurs and the rostered Delta 1 is too far away or already dealing with another incident, SurfCom can reflex-task the area's local duty officer network for a Delta 2.

Delta 2 fulfills the same role as a Delta 1 when it comes to assisting patrols. Their callsign is designated by the location to which they are responding. For example, if the incident is occurring at Raglan, the duty officer's callsign would be "Delta 2 Raglan".

=== Peer Support ===
Peer Support is a programme designed to support the welfare of Surf Life Saving members. Peer Supporters provide an ear for members who are having issues in their club or have experienced a traumatic situation through their lifesaving duties.

There are five Peer Support networks in Northern Region including Northland, Rodney, East Coast Auckland, West Coast Auckland and Waikato. Each of these networks has a team of trained Peer Supporters who can be tasked by SurfCom to attend debriefs and support lifeguards involved in a traumatic or stressful incident.

Peer Supporters also help organise formal psychological debriefing with trained counselors and educate members on stress reactions and natural coping mechanisms.
