= Surf Life Saving New Zealand =

Water safety organisation in New Zealand

Surf Life Saving New Zealand Inc.
- SLSNZ Logo
- Abbreviation: SLSNZ
- Formation: 1 March 1910 (116 years ago)
- Type: NGO
- Legal status: Incorporated Society, Charity
- Purpose: To protect our community in the water.
- Headquarters: Wellington
- Region served: New Zealand
- Members: 18,800
- President: Marilyn Moffatt
- Main organ: Board of Directors
- Staff: 46
- Website: SLSNZ Website

Surf Life Saving New Zealand (SLSNZ) is the national association representing 74 Surf Life Saving Clubs in New Zealand. The organisation's motto is 'In it for Life'. This refers to both the long relationship many members have with the organisation, as well as to the organisation's purpose of preventing drowning and injury, thereby saving lives.

Specific New Zealand beaches are patrolled by qualified Surf Lifeguards from mid October until April each year. Red and Yellow flags indicate that a beach is patrolled by Surf Lifeguards. The area of water in between these flags is designated as the safest place to swim on the beach, as well as showing where Surf Lifeguards are patrolling. It is widely publicised that beachgoers should "Swim Between the Flags" in order to be safe while swimming in the ocean.

Surf lifeguards are identifiable by their yellow shirts and red shorts. Surf Life Saving New Zealand is sponsored chiefly by BP, TSB, DHL and Lotto.

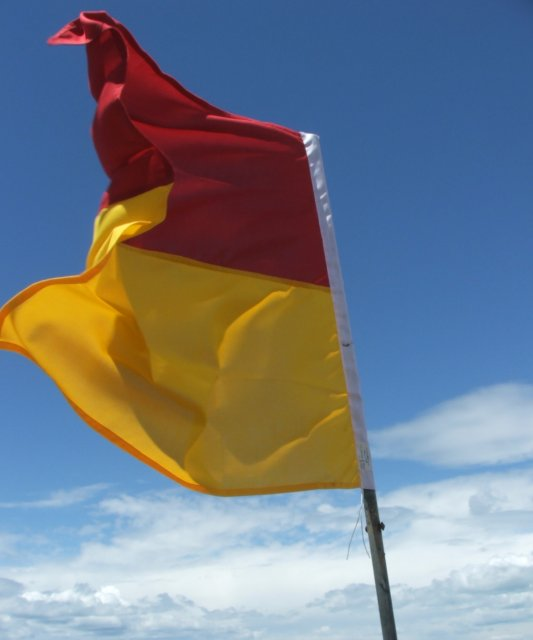
A Red-Yellow flag indicating a patrolled beach

== History ==
In the early years of the 20th century, the New Zealand Amateur Swimming Association (NZASA) controlled the limited amount of life saving activity by explaining resuscitation methods and providing demonstrations at swimming club carnivals. The next step occurred in 1912 when the Royal Life Saving Society (RLSS) was formed during a conference, called by Canterbury, of all the head centres. The RLSS was established in Christchurch and remains there to this day.

The first surf clubs began in the years 1909 to 1910 leading off with: Castlecliff (Wanganui), Lyall Bay (Wellington), New Brighton (Christchurch) and Worser Bay Wellington. Over the next few years other clubs formed, around five regions: Wellington, Christchurch, Dunedin, Gisborne/Napier/New Plymouth and Wanganui.

Piha Surf Life Saving Club was founded in 1934, and as such is the oldest club in Auckland. It is also the home of Piha Rescue. However Waipu Cove Surf Life Saving Club is notable for being the oldest club in the Northern region.

Soon after the clubs were formed, rivalries developed and this led to the formation of competitions between the clubs and regions. By early 1912 competitions were being organised by Wellington's Maranui Club, with male members competing in squads of 8. The competitions consisted of a land drill and 'reel test'. The first national champs where clubs were able to compete was held in 1922.

Surf Life Saving in New Zealand continues to grow in size and there are now 74 affiliated surf clubs.

== Organisational structure ==
Surf Life Saving New Zealand (SLSNZ) is the national association representing 74 Surf Life Saving Clubs in New Zealand.

Around 19,000 people are members of SLSNZ. The 74 clubs are grouped for consultation and programme delivery purposes into local regions, and are supported by Surf Life Saving New Zealand staff. These new groupings were an outcome of the membership voting in a new and bold constitution in September 2009, known as "Project Groundswell".

== About surf lifesaving ==
In New Zealand, surf lifesaving is both a sport and a community service. To participate in either facet it is necessary to be a member of a club, and to have the ‘entry level’ qualification - the Surf Lifeguard Award, formerly the Bronze Medallion.

There are a range of other surf lifeguard and surf related qualifications available through the SLSNZ structure, including more advanced lifesaving certificates, Inflatable Rescue Boat (IRB) qualifications, VHF radio and first aid qualifications.

Volunteer lifeguards patrol beaches and work with the public to prevent people getting in trouble. In the summer of 2018/19 volunteers performed over 118,000 preventative actions during 237,000 hours of beach patrols.

Sport events are held at club, regional and national level, and in the age categories of Under 15, Under 17, Under 19 and Open. Events span the range of rescue skills and test competitors’ strength, fitness and agility in swimming, running, paddling a surf ski, board or canoe or rowing a surf boat. Racing Inflatable Rescue Boats is an increasingly popular part of the sport.

== Funding ==
SLSNZ's income is $6m a year derived from sponsorship, gaming machine grants and The NZ Lottery Grants Board. The organisation's total income is approximately $11m. SLSNZ does not charge a national membership levy, instead providing programmes and distributing over $2m each year to clubs. In 2020, it was announced that SLSNZ would receive $9.4m per year in government funding to support club operational expenses, club capital projects and replace high risk revenue streams. However, the full cost of running Surf Life Saving clubs is over $12m per annum and this contribution is expected to only cover around 15% of SLSNZ costs. Therefore, financial support from valued partners including sponsors, councils, grant funders and donations are still required.

== Patrol statistics ==
For the 2018/19 Season (last reported season), Surf Lifeguards attended the following incidents (as per annual report):

Surf Life Saving New Zealand Totals

- Hours worked: 237,721
- Lives saved (rescues): 702
- People assisted to safety: 1,622
- First aid actions: 2,578
- Searches completed: 381
- Preventative actions: 118,307

== See also ==
- Surf Life Saving Northern Region
- Royal Life Saving Society Australia
