= Long boat rescue =

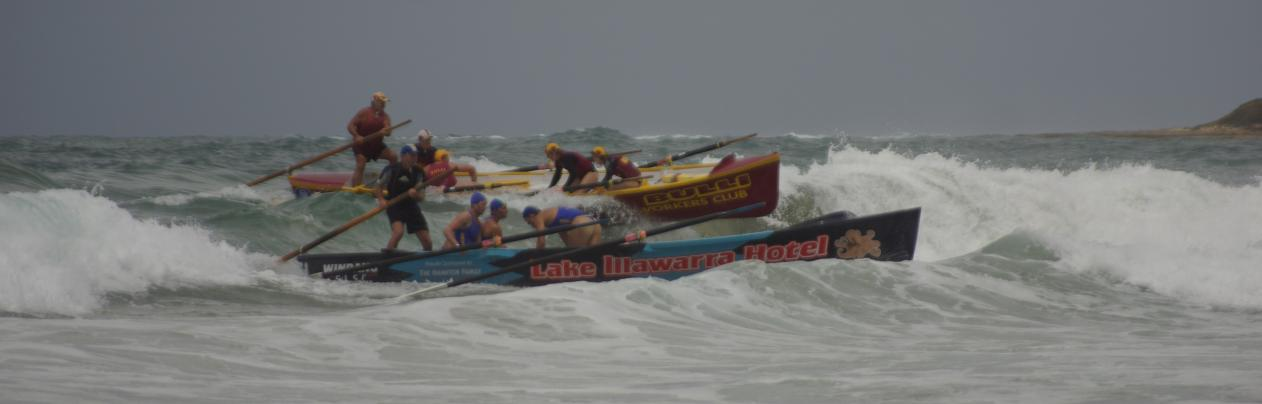
Surf boat competition during a surf carnival.

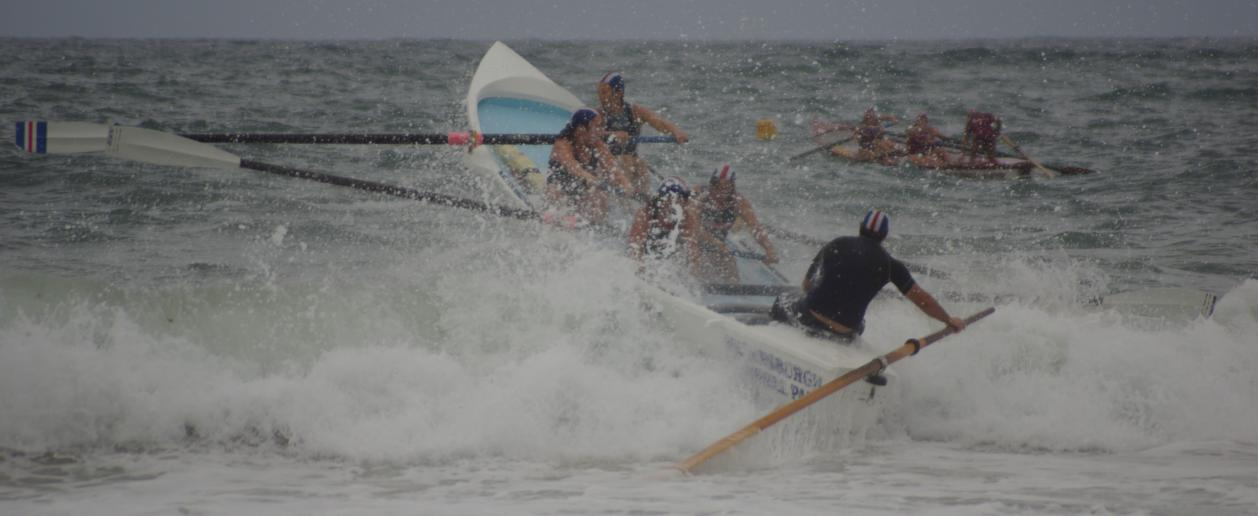
Surf boat passing a breaker.

In surf lifesaving, long boats, called surf boats, while no longer used for rescues, remain one of the most popular events at surf lifesaving carnivals. The boats weigh between 180 and 250 kilograms and are crewed by four rowers and a sweep.

== Operation ==
=== Positions ===
The positions in the boat are as follows:

Bow (1) - the position nearest the bow (front) of the boat. Often regarded as the most dangerous of the positions.

Second Bow (2) - the next nearest the bow, their oar is on the opposite side to the bow rower's and these two rowers comprise the bow pair.

Second Stroke (3) - the next seat away from the bow and probably the seat closest to the centre of the boat, their main role is to stabilise the boat. Their oar is on the same side of the boat as the bow rower.

Stroke (4) - the seat closest to the stern (back) of the boat and the rower responsible for setting the speed and timing of the crew's rowing stroke. They combine with Second Stroke to make up the stern pair and their oar is on the same side as that of Second Bow.

Sweep - the person in charge of steering the boat and, as they're the only one who can see what's ahead, they generally call the shots on the water. They also frequently double as the crew's coach.

== Racing ==
The boats race by rowing out to a marker buoy placed several hundred metres offshore, turning around it and returning to shore as quickly as possible. Boats work to avoid crashing through waves on the way out as they seriously slow progress, but aim to catch a wave as early as possible on the way back as this is the fastest method of travel for a boat. The surf factor is where things get interesting as boats slew sideways, roll, crash into each other, have sweeps and rowers thrown into the water - generally creating an exciting spectacle for spectators.

== Surf boats at Piha Surf Life Saving Club, New Zealand ==
Piha Surf Life Saving Club pioneered the use of surf rescue boats in New Zealand, with the country's first surf boat, launched in 1936. On 9 April 1939 the first ever surf boat race held in New Zealand took place at Piha Beach with Piha winning against Wainui Club. In 1940 a Piha crew comprising; Tom Pearce, Haden Way, Max Cleary, Jack Rae and Tiger O'Brien rowing in a randomly allocated boat were the inaugural winners of the National Surf Boat Championship Series, held at Wellington's Lyall Bay.

In 1967 Sir Jack Butland of Butland Industries provided the surf boat Piha built by Bailey Bros of Sydney to the club. In 1971 Sir Jack provided the club with Miss Chesdale. Another boat Ches'n' Dale was dedicated in 1979. More Ches'n'Dale boats followed, with numbers three and four donated in 1985.

Piha won the gruelling Tuakua Sands River Race – from Tuakau to Port Waikato in 1983, 1984, 1985 and 1986. In various competitions during 1987 Piha accumulated 33 wins and 2 seconds. In 1985 at Mount Maunganui a Piha crew comprising Steve Booten, Mike MacDonald, Peter Digan, Mark McCarthny and Mike Zainey as sweep became the first New Zealand "Test" Crew to beat Australia.

The first attempt at rowing a surf boat from Onehunga to Piha over the unpredictable and treacherous Manukau Heads Bar was made in April 1971. It was decided to negotiate the north channel as the safer south channel used by shipping would have added another seven kilometers to the row. As the crew comprising Andy Sekula, Mike Zainey, Ray Markham, Brian Sullivan and Alan Foubister rowed down the narrow northern channel with big dumping surf on either side, huge swells came up and the channel petered out leaving the boat in the surf zone. There was no route to get through the surf line leaving no option but to wait for a lull and head for the beach on a wave. The boat hit the beach with such force that the keel was split in half and all the ribs in the boat were broken. Despite the boat being a write-off, sponsorship for the row and publicity gained about $2,000 for the club. The feat of getting all the way to Piha was not fully accomplished until 1992 with a crew comprising George Thompson, Brett Sullivan, Martin Wienk, Johan Broekhuizen, Duane Rice and Geoff Calvert rowing Lend Lease all the way to Piha. The trip took over five hours in high swells and stiff winds. At one stage in this row George Thomson was thrown overboard after the surf boat hit a three-meter-high (9.8 ft) swell.

The first Piha Big Wave Classic (Day of the Giants) was held at Piha Beach in April 2005 with 12 crews on the beach and Piha coming in second in the open men's race. These races, held annually are part of the national surf life saving championship surf boat series. In 2007 three crews came from Australia (Bronte, Jan Juc and Austinmer) to compete in these races. In 2014 Piha became the first club to win the trifecta at Piha - Mark HORSE Bourneville Swept 3 crews the Open Men's, Open Women's and Under 23 Men. The big wave classic will be held at Piha on February 21, 2015.

In 2008 Piha crews comprising James Dallinger, Brad Mytton, Hayden Smith, Craig Knox, Matt Kirke, Mark Bourneville and Bruce O'Brien won the European Open Surf Boat Championships (also known as the World Surf Rowing Championships) at Biarritz, France. In 2012 Piha A crew won the Battle of the Ditch Surfboat Race (New Zealand versus Australia) and became the first crew to win the Australian Surf Life Saving men's open Australian Surf Rowers League title.

In 2013 Piha became the first club to win five Golds Surf boat Medals at a New Zealand National Surf Life Saving Championships, Mark HORSE Bourneville Swept 3 crews and won 2 x double titles and a gold and silver with U19 (Open Men long and short courses, Under 23 Men long and short courses and under 19 Men long course).

At the 2014 New Zealand Nationals Phia became the first crew to win 8 New Zealand titles in five consecutive seasons. The 2014 Piha A crew was Paul Gerritsen, Chris Morris, Scott Lissington, Benjamin Richards, Ben Scott and sweep Mark Bourneville. The under 23 crew also scored a first – the first to win 5 New Zealand National titles in the under 23 division, the crew included Mark Bournevilles two twin sons Cedric & Ludovik Bourneville. The club also became the first to win 4 of the 6 divisional New Zealand Surf Boat Series titles - Men's Open, Women's Open, Under 23 Men's and Under 19 Women. The current Piha surf boats, sponsored by Burger Fuel and Trillion Trust, are named after previous Piha great boaties:- Tom Pearce, E D Wright, Buddy Lucas and Tiger O'Brien

The Piha Boaties during Mark HORSE Bourneville's Boat captaincy the Piha boaties obtained the greatest decade in winning national titles 25 titles over a 10-year period. Bourneville himself won 21 of the titles.
