= Fred Lucas (rugby union) =

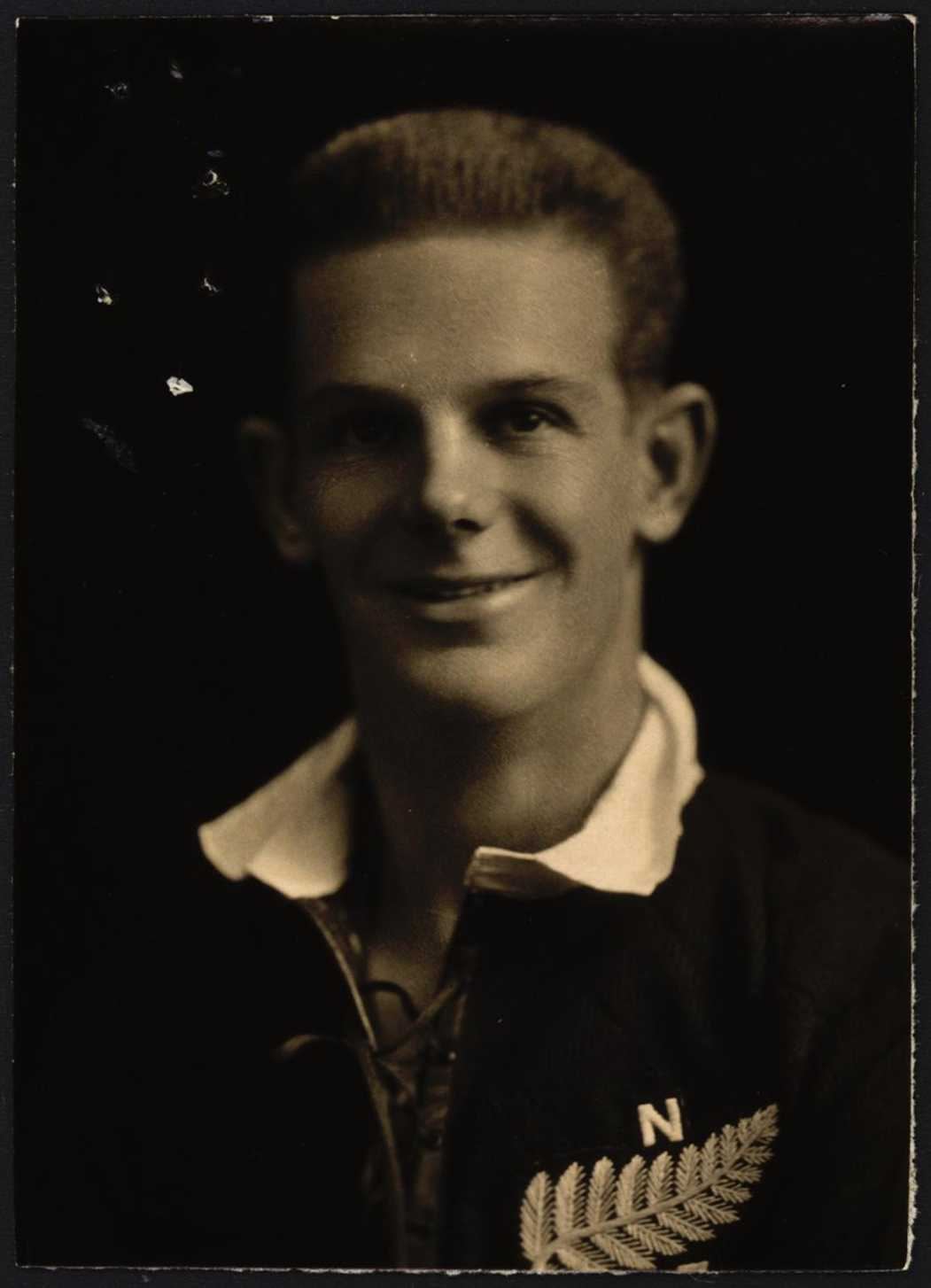
- Born: Frederick William Lucas; 30 January 1902 Auckland, New Zealand
- Died: 17 September 1957 (aged 55) Auckland, New Zealand
- Height: 1.78 m (5 ft 10 in)
- Weight: 73 kg (161 lb)
- School: Seddon Memorial Technical College
- Notable relative: Buddy Lucas (son)

Rugby union career
- Position: Three-quarter
Provincial / State sides
Years	Team	Apps	(Points)
1920–30	Auckland		
International career
Years	Team	Apps	(Points)
1923–30	New Zealand	7	(3)

Frederick William Lucas (30 January 1902 – 17 September 1957) was a New Zealand rugby union player. A three-quarter, Lucas represented Auckland at a provincial level, and was a member of the New Zealand national side, the All Blacks, from 1923 to 1930. He played 41 matches for the All Blacks including seven internationals. In the 1930s he coached Ponsonby and was a selector for the Auckland (1938–46), North Island (1939–46) and New Zealand (1945–46) teams. He was also a surf lifesaver, representing Piha at the New Zealand championships.

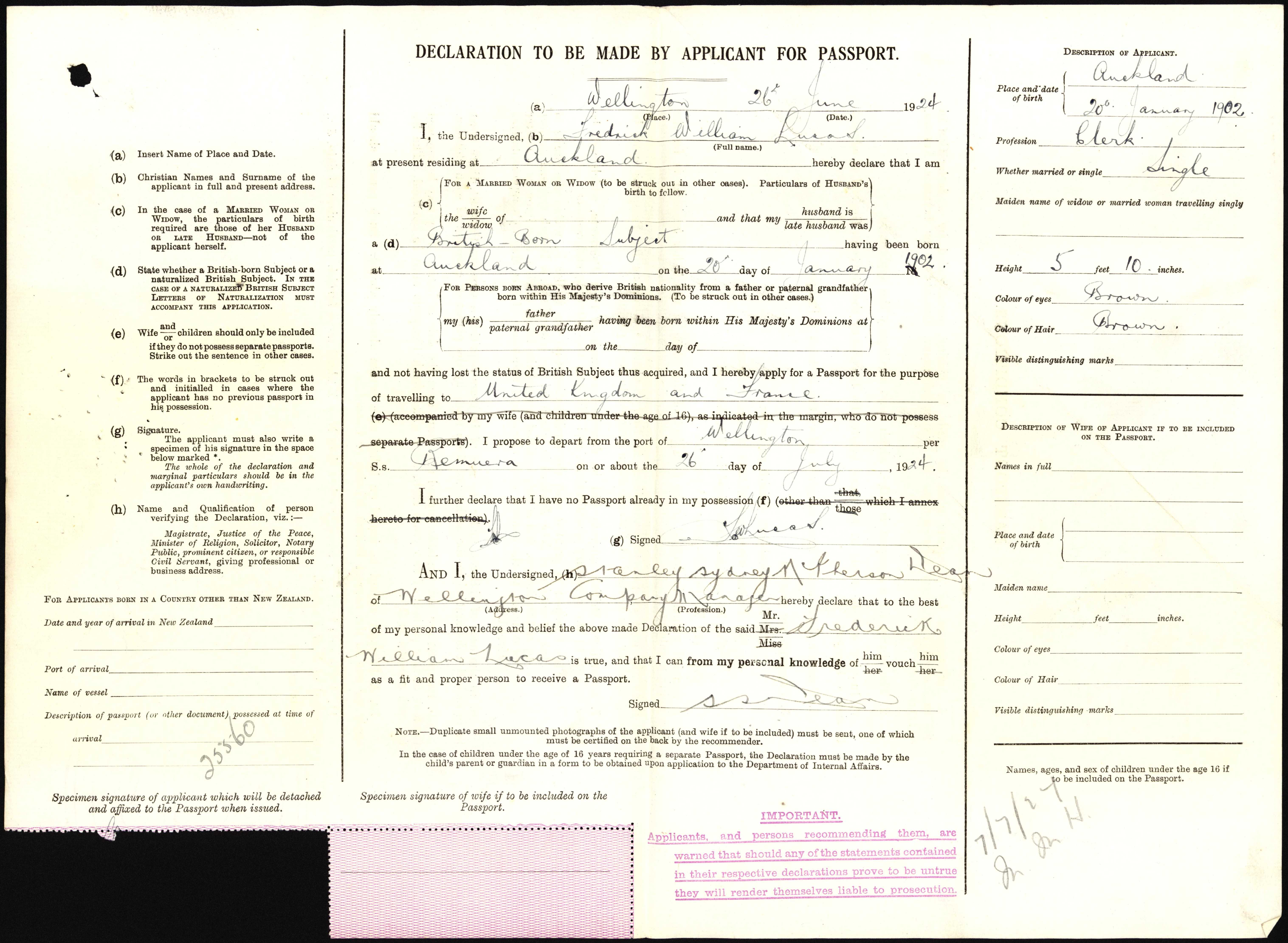
Fredrick Lucas passport application (1924)
