= Orewa Surf Life Saving Club =

Life saving club in New Zealand

Orewa Surf Life Saving Club, or Orewa SLSC, is a surf lifesaving club in New Zealand. It is one of 17 such clubs in the Northern Region of New Zealand.

== History ==
Orewa SLSC was formed in 1950 by members of Milford SLSC which had fallen into recess. At this time the estuary outflow travelled north along the beach and ended about where the club now sits. This made the beach quite dangerous and was the reason that the club is sited where it is. In the late 1950s the Air Force bombed the channel in the estuary and this changed the river out flow straight out to sea.

Club members originally stayed in a tent in the camping ground and later built a small shed about where the public toilets are to the south of the club. The first proper clubhouse was opened in 1960. Funds were raised by the club building and operating a skating rink on the domain. This was closed in the early 1990s and the remains can still be seen to the left of the domain entry drive. The original clubhouse structure is still incorporated into the building and is roughly where the lounge/restaurant is. An upstairs addition was added in the late 1970s and further additions made in the early 1990s to give the clubhouse its existing area.

Women were allowed to join as active members for the first time in 1972/73 and the club added a Junior Surf section in 1974/75. In the early years members mainly came from Auckland. This has changed since the late 1970s, when the local population started to grow significantly. Most of the club's members are now local.

Over the years, the club has performed over 1100 rescues, in addition to countless other actions such as first aids, preventative actions, and so on.
