= Auckland Marine Rescue Centre =

Rescue centre in New Zealand

Coordinates: 36.84693°S 174.78873°E

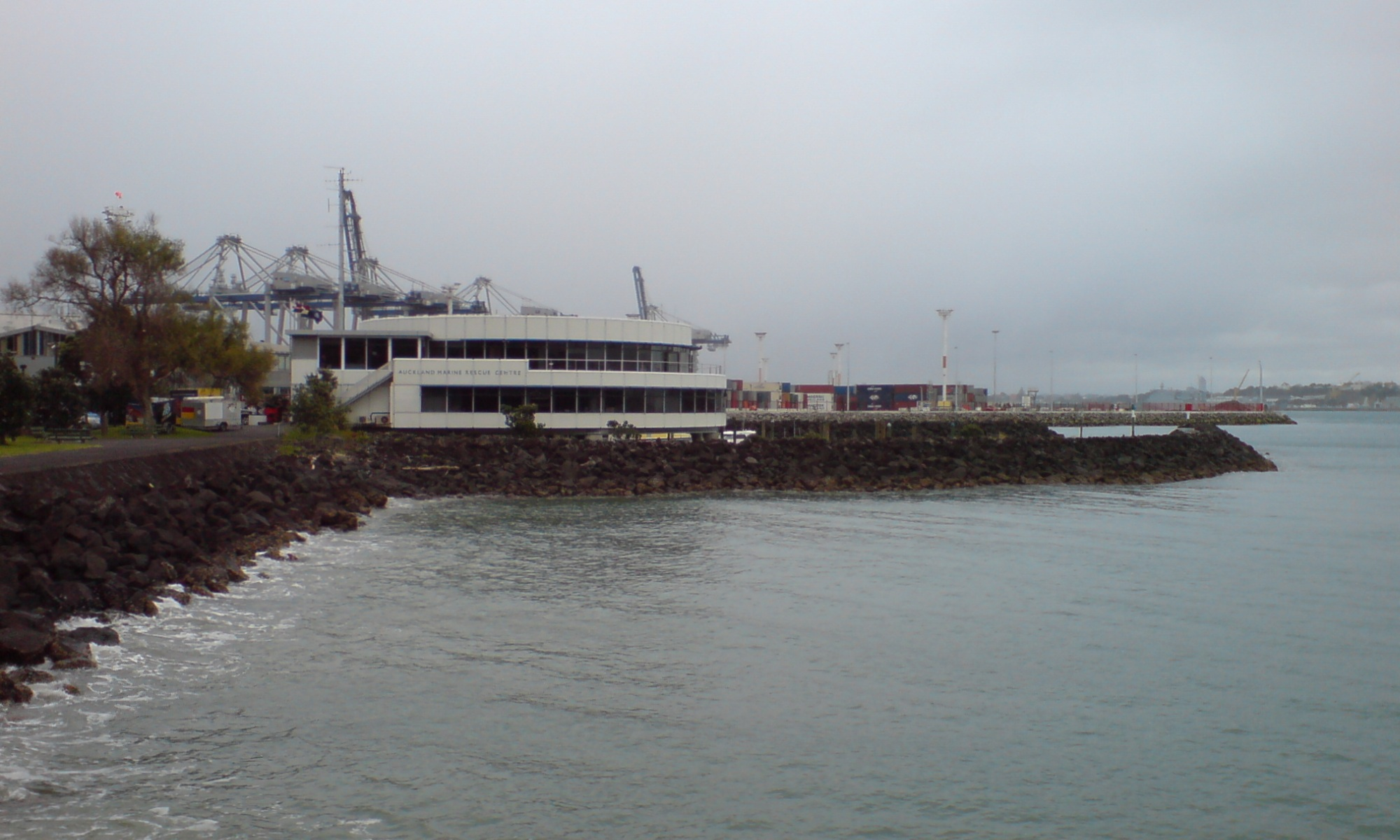
The centre at the eastern end of the Waitematā Harbour

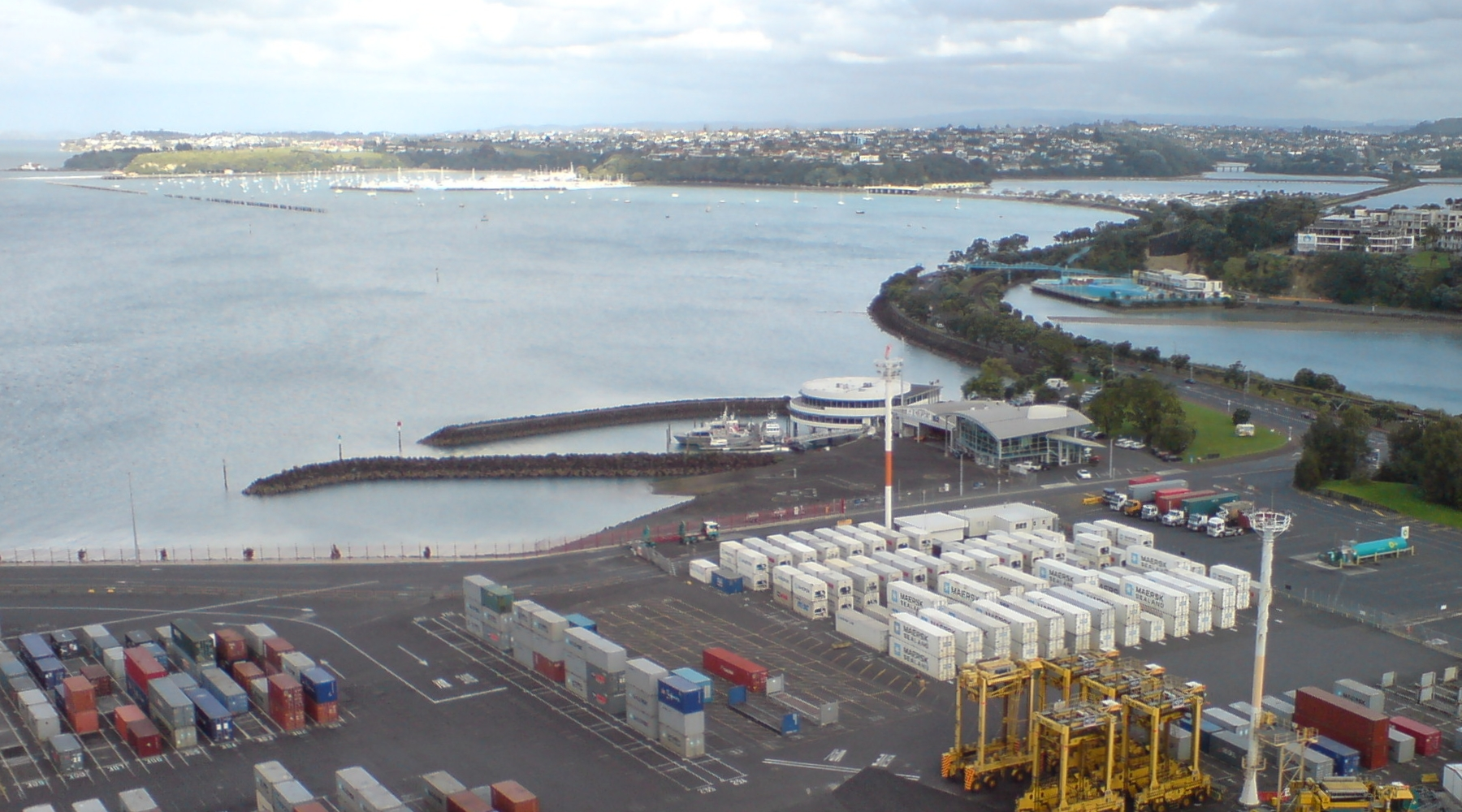
The centre from the west, from one of the Ports of Auckland container cranes.

The Auckland Marine Rescue Centre is the control centre for the Coastguard Northern Region and Surf Lifesaving New Zealand's control centre SurfCom. It also houses other marine services such as the Harbourmaster and the Maritime Police. It is located in Mechanics Bay, Auckland, at the eastern end of the Ports of Auckland container terminal.

== Funding ==
The facilities of the Auckland Marine Rescue Centre were built with a donation by the Auckland Harbour Board (now having become the commercial entity managing the Port of Auckland) and were first brought into operation in 1991. The operation of the centre is paid for by the organisations that occupy the building through the AMRC Trust.

== Facilities ==
The circular centre building centre houses a marine communications centre, operational 24/7/365 and fields over 100,000 calls per year, from trip reports to emergency calls (dealing with around 1,600 actual incidents a year). These calls are mainly via VHF marine radio or cell phone. The radio room as well as the emergency craft of the Coastguard are largely staffed by volunteers.

A heliport is also located directly next to the centre with a hangar. Directly attached to the north of the centre is a small artificial harbour sheltering the craft of the rescue, police, harbourmaster. Several meeting rooms for events and functions are also available, and often cater for education services such as water safety.
