= Piha Rescue =

- Genre: Factual
- Written by: Elizabeth Donnelly
- Directed by: Elizabeth Donnelly; Anja Janse; Eric Derks
- Starring: Piha Surf Life Saving Club lifeguards
- Narrated by: John Sumner
- No. of seasons: 12

Production
- Producers: Eric Derks; Elizabeth Donnelly
- Editor: Sam Lynch
- Production company: South Pacific Video

Original release
- Network: TV One, Prime
- Release: 2001 – 2017

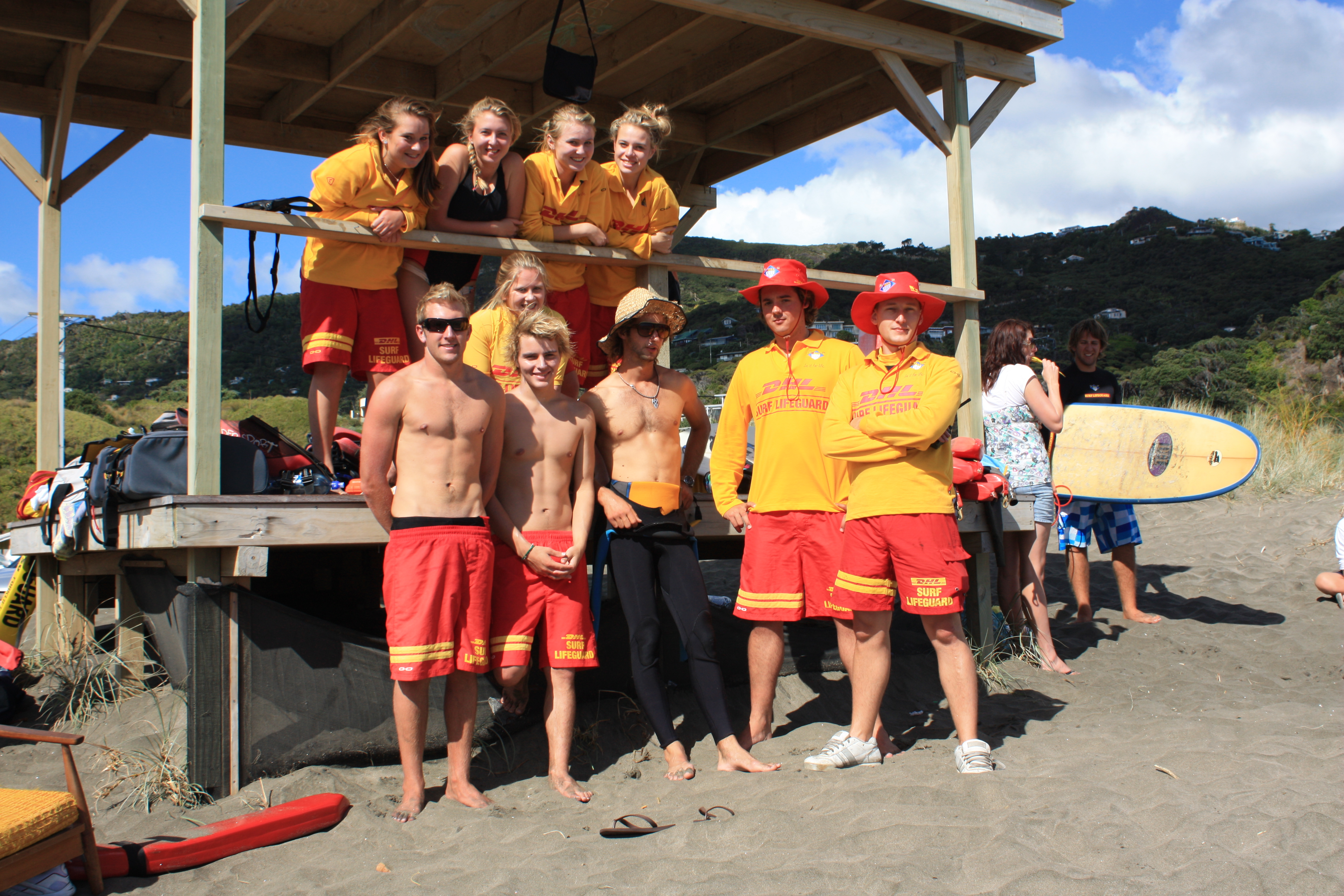
Piha Lifeguards. 2009

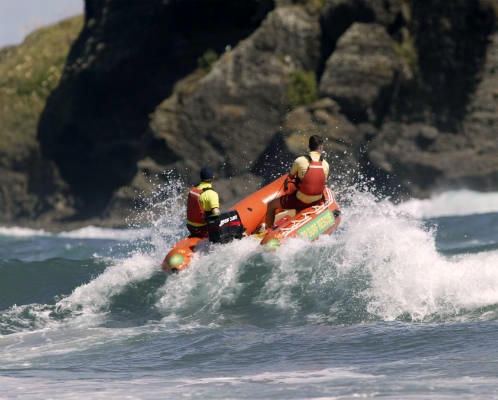
Piha IRB with Fallen Rocks in Background

Piha Rescue is a New Zealand reality series following the daily actions of the Piha Surf Life Saving Club lifeguards on Piha surf beach, one of the country's most popular beaches. Piha is one of the many beaches located on the North Island West Coast near Auckland.

Filming commenced on Piha Rescue for the first time in the summer of 2001, followed by a one-hour documentary airing in December 2002 (aired as Piha Patrol). It was the first reality show in the world following lifeguards.

In 2003 the first series screened on Television New Zealand followed by a further ten; with the final (12th) series screened on Prime in 2016 and 2017. Screened in New Zealand as Piha Rescue, it has also been sold around the world under various titles, such as Deadly Surf and Surf Rescue. As of May 2019 it currently airs on Freeview Channel ThreeLife, generally on Sundays at 7 PM.

== See also ==
- Bondi Rescue
