= Piha Surf Life Saving Club =

Life saving club in New Zealand

Piha Surf Life Saving Club Inc.
- Abbreviation: Piha SLSC
- Formation: January 10, 1934; 92 years ago
- Type: Not For Profit
- Legal status: Incorporated Society, Charity
- Headquarters: Piha, Auckland, New Zealand
- Location: Piha Beach
- President: Peter Brown
- Affiliations: Surf Life Saving Northern Region (SLSNR)
- Website: Piha SLSC Website

Piha Surf Life Saving Club (sometimes called Piha Lifeguard Service) is a surf lifesaving club for the southern section of Piha, on the west coast of Auckland, New Zealand, some 45 km from the Auckland City centre. The patrol was featured in the TVNZ reality show Piha Rescue.

The club is the best-known of 17 surf lifesaving clubs in the Northern Region of New Zealand, and possibly one of the best-known surf lifesaving clubs in the entire country. Its high-profile is partly being due to its participation in the television series and partly through its location on one of the country's most-popular surfing beaches. The beach is also a regular venue for the annual "Piha Big Wave Surf Boat Classic".

The club was founded in January 1934 by Frank Ross, Cliff Holt, Bert Holt, Stan Holt, Laurie Wilson, and as such is the oldest club on Auckland's West Coast. The club colours were chosen as black, red and green: black for the iron sands of the West Coast, red for the sunsets above the Tasman Sea to the West, and green for the forest clad Waitākere Ranges that separate Piha from Auckland City.

Piha has been the home club of many national champions in surf life saving and other sports, among them former Commonwealth Games swimming gold medallist Dave Gerrard, national boxing champion Jackie Jenkins, and the champion swimmer Buddy Lucas.

Piha Surf Life Saving Club - Clubhouse 1935

Cork filled rescue belt being used during training at Piha c. 1935

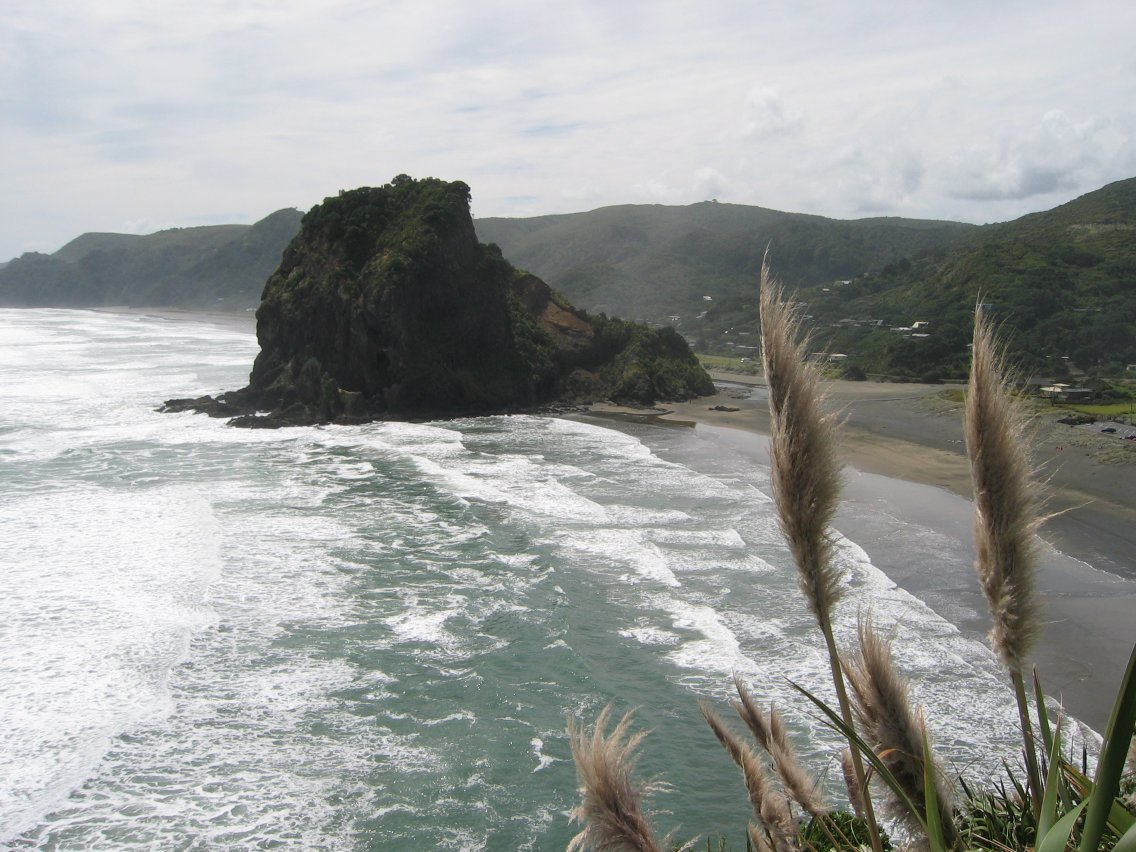
Looking North over Piha Beach to Lion Rock

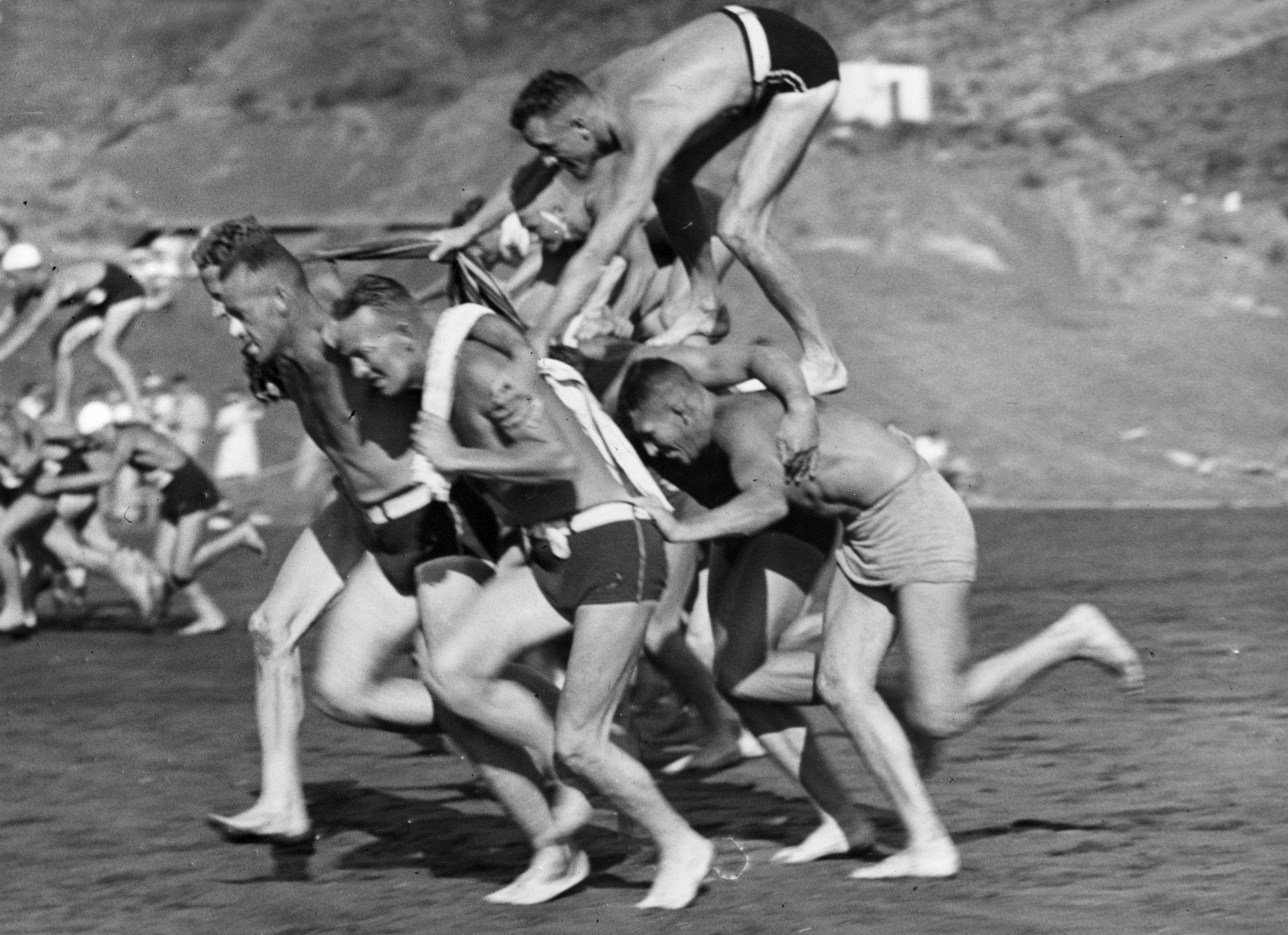
Chariot Race, Piha Surf Club Carnival, c. 1938

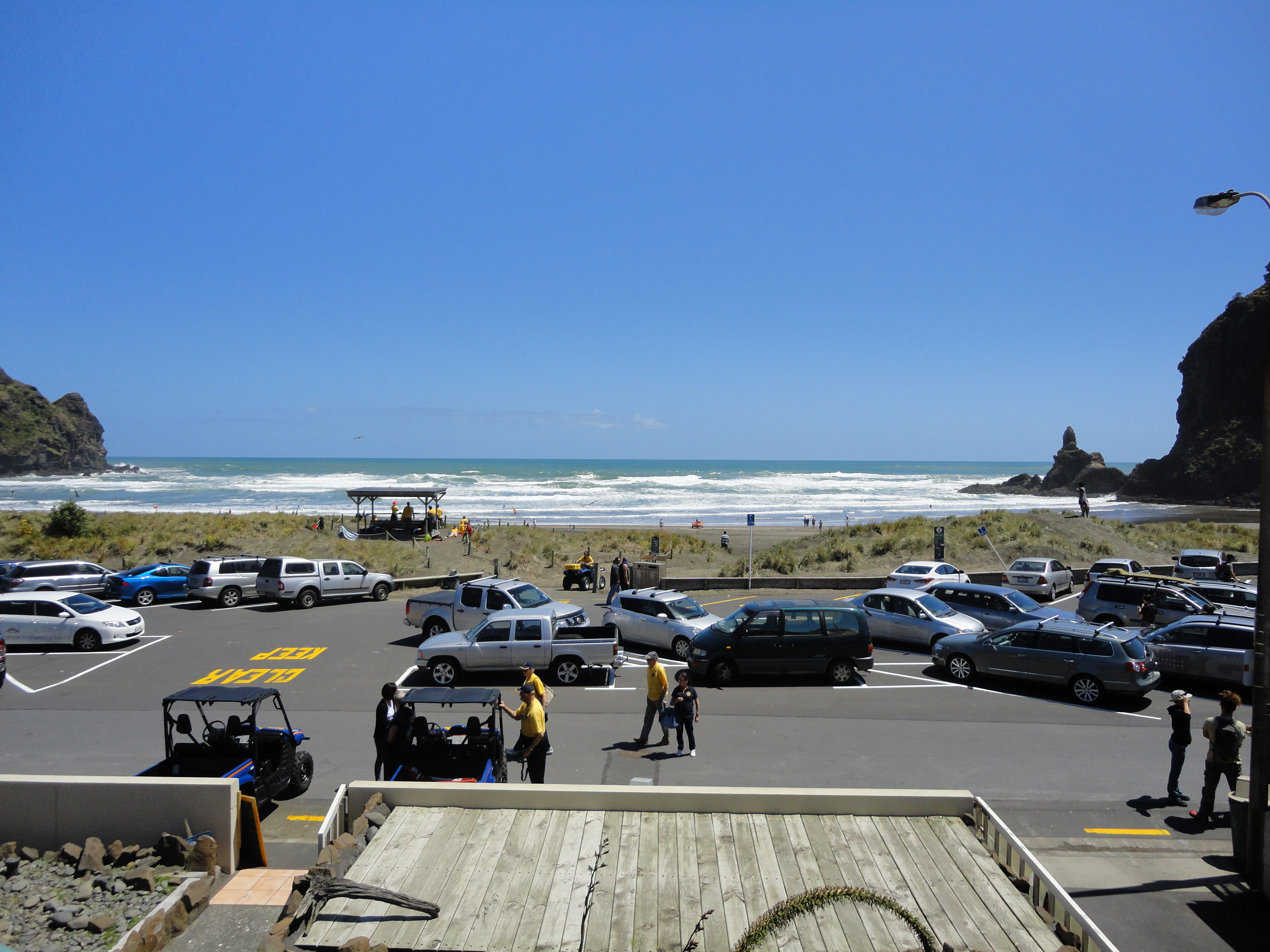
View of Piha Beach from Piha Surf Life Saving Club Lounge

== Patrolling statistics ==
The table below gives a summary of the Patrol statistics for the Volunteer Lifeguards of Piha SLSC. This table excludes the statistics for the paid Regional Lifeguards who use Piha Surf Life Saving Club's equipment and facilities.

Season	Total Volunteer Hours Worked	Number of People Rescued	Number of First Aids	Number of Searches	Number of Preventative Actions	Number Of People Involved
2018/2019	7,029	27	66	55	4,027	16,285
2017/2018	7,826	46	78	12	2,746	9,173
2016/2017	8,788	55	62	10	3,529	11,440
2015/2016	7,080	60	109	12	3,049	13,265

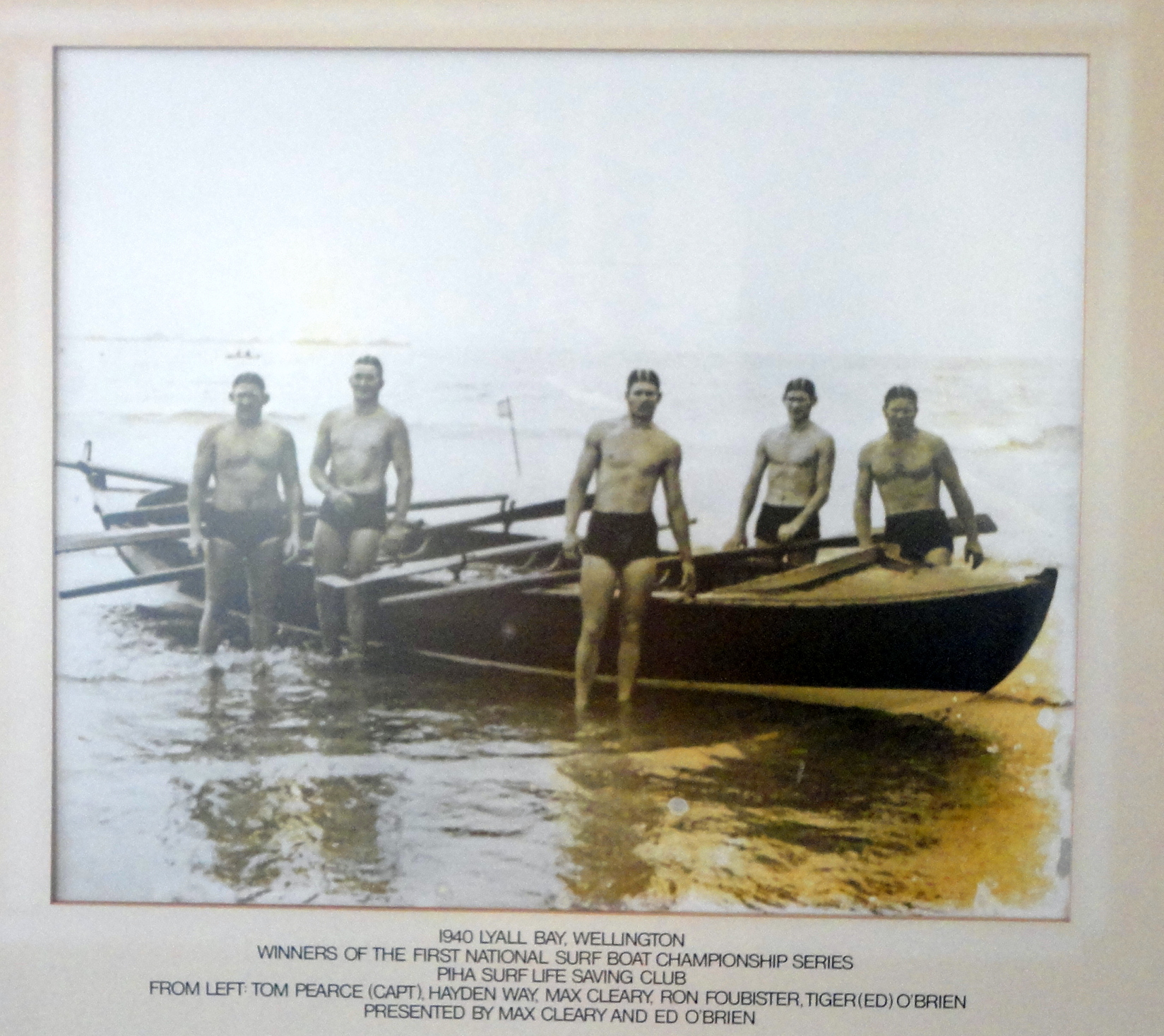
Piha Double Ended Surf Boat - 1940 New Zealand National Champions

Don Wright on his designed Tear Drop Surf Rescue Ski

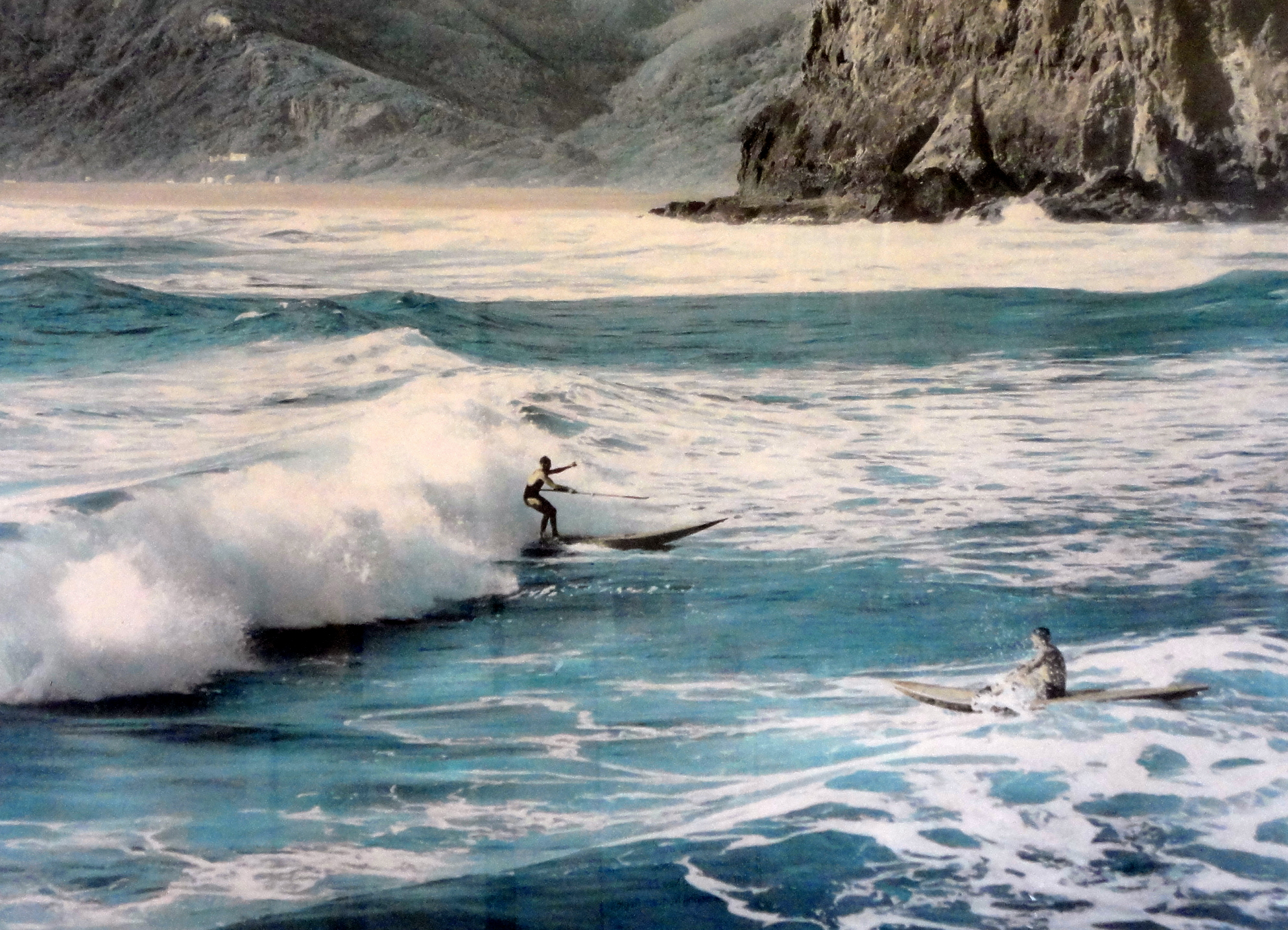
Piha Life Guards using Tear Drop Surf Skis

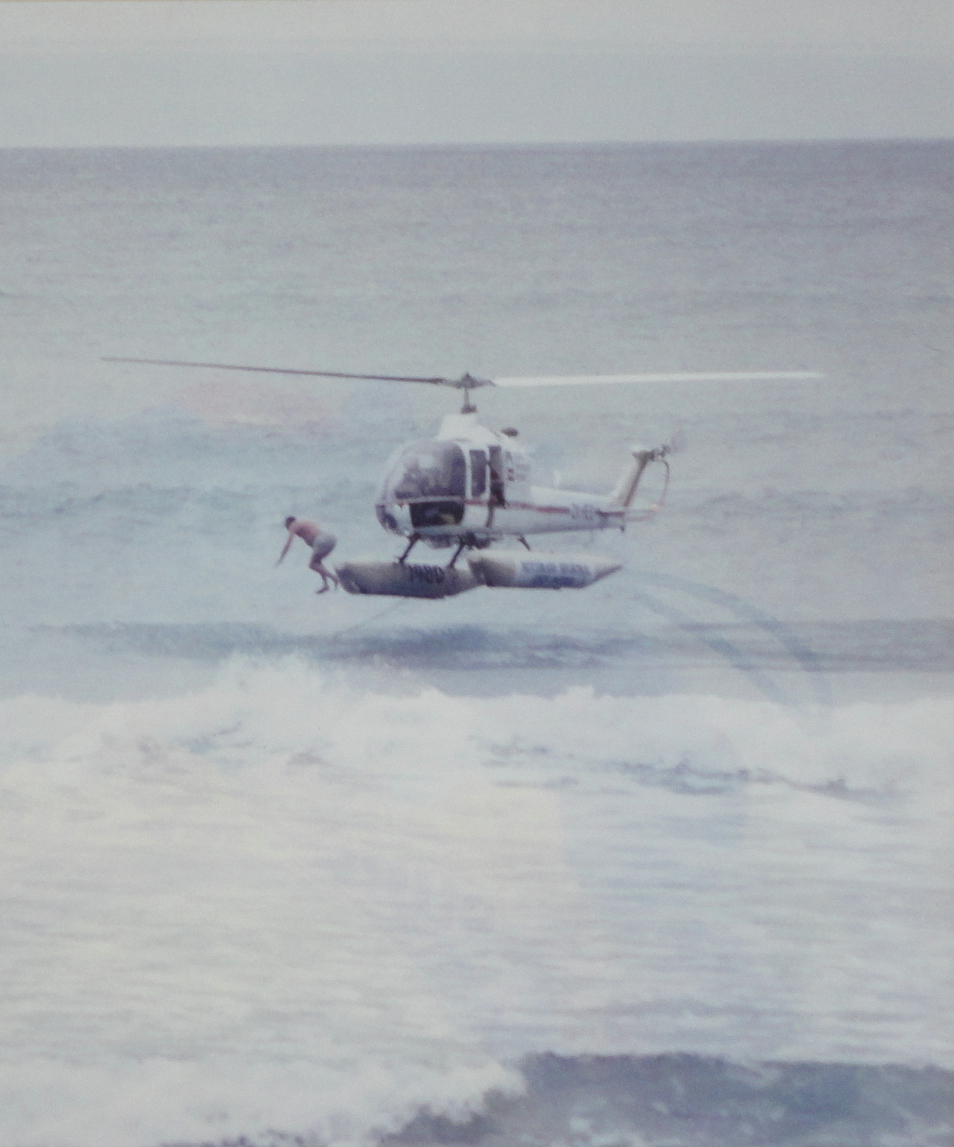
Prime Minister of New Zealand, Robert Muldoon, doing a Surf Jump at Piha from the Auckland Rescue Helicopter 1977

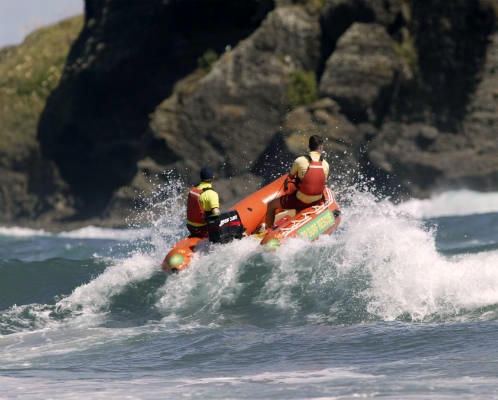
Piha IRB with Fallen Rocks in Background

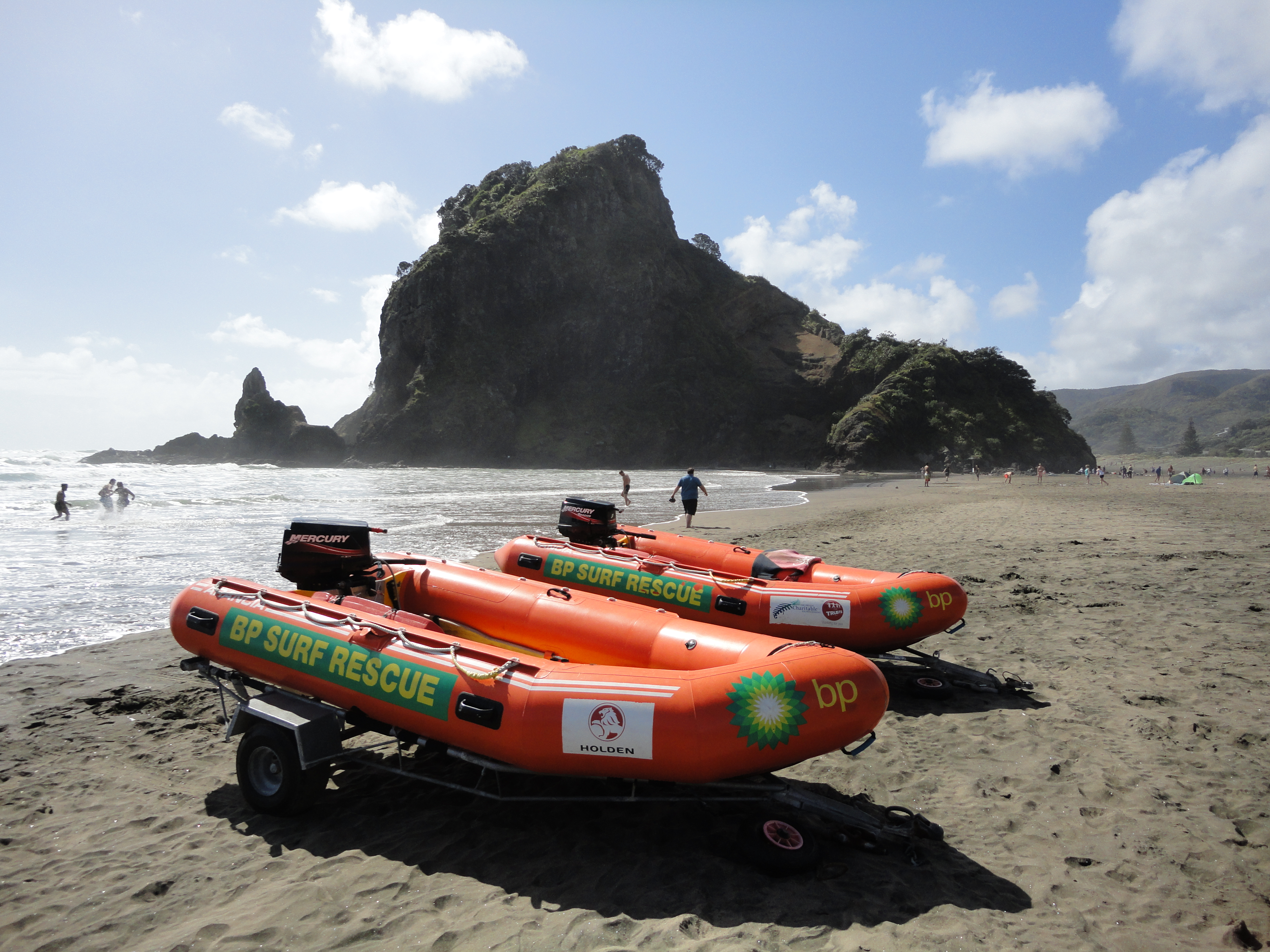
Piha Surf Life Saving Club IRBs with Lion Rock

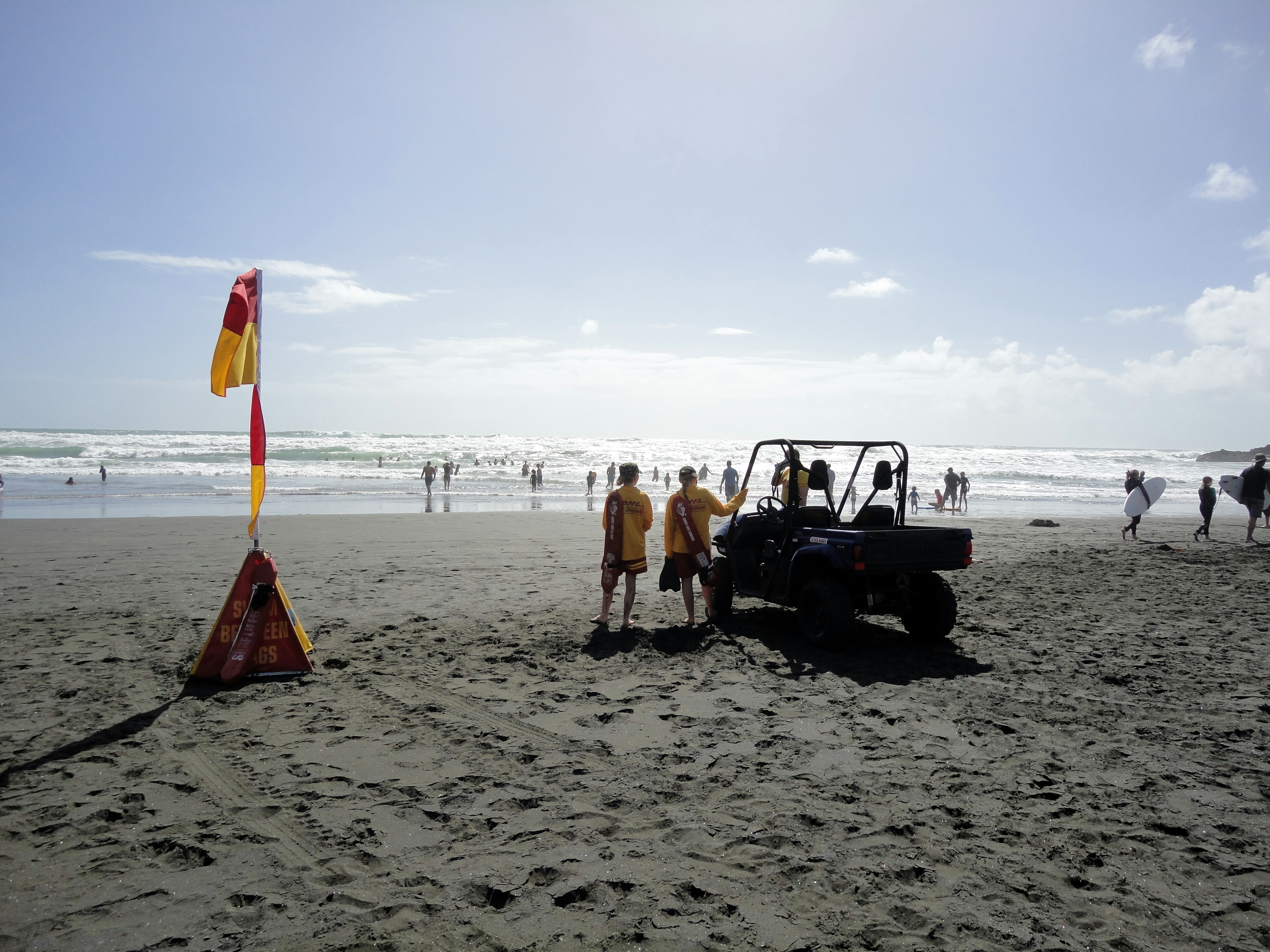
Piha Surf Life Saving Club - Lifeguards on Patrol

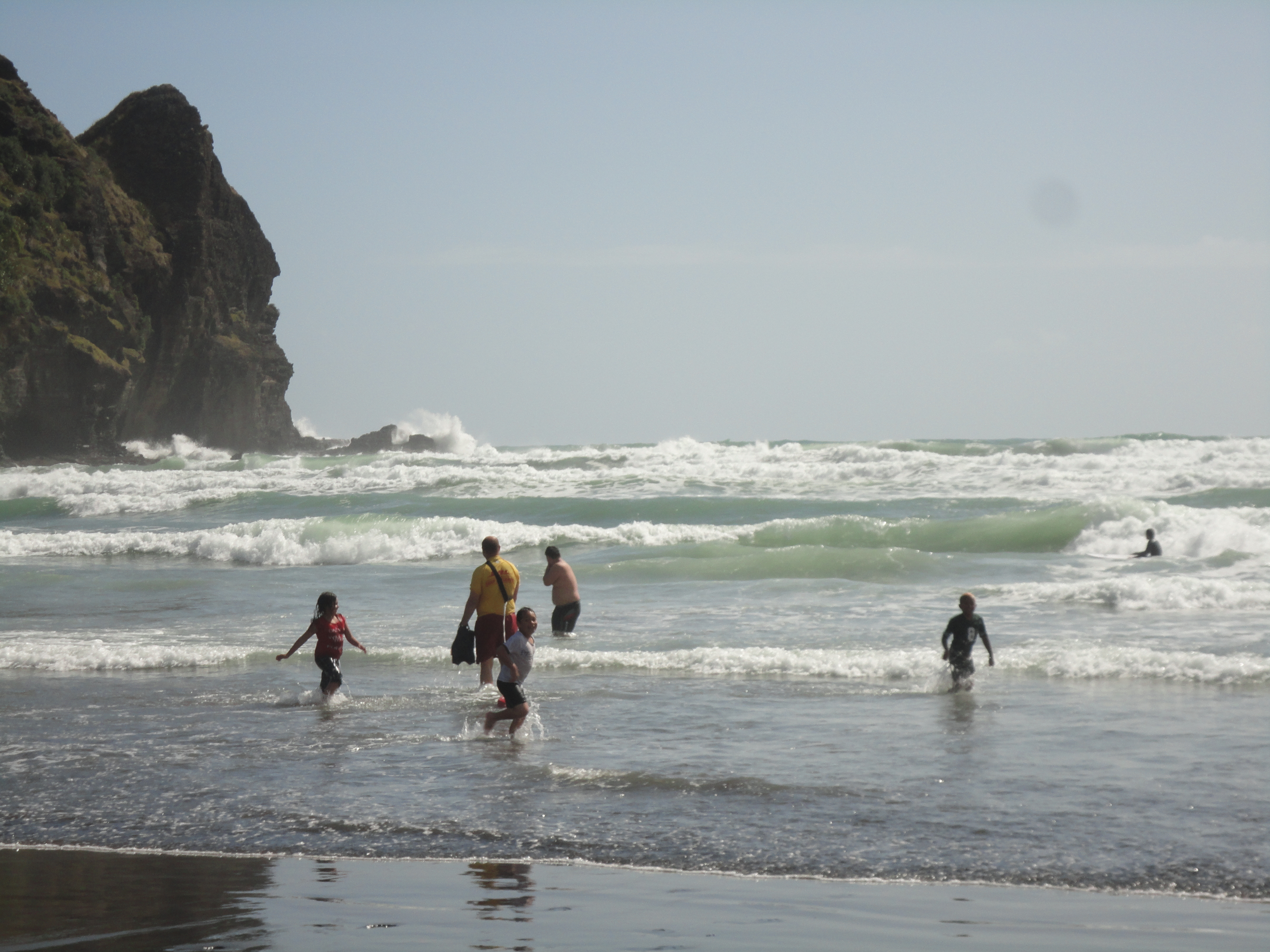
Piha Surf Life Saving Club Lifeguard Directing Swimmers in to the Flagged Area

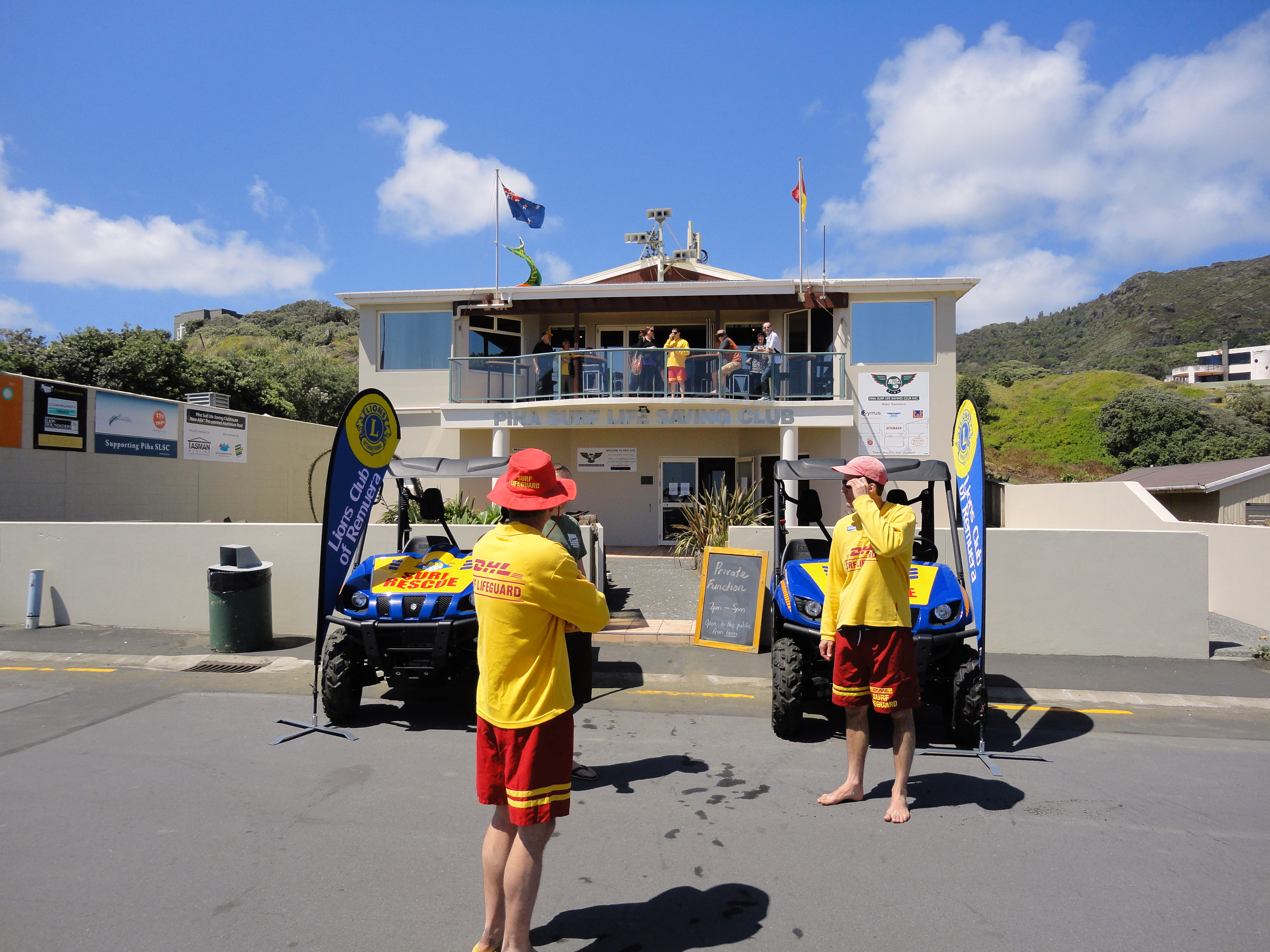
Piha SLSC - Lifeguard Patrol Bikes donated by Lions Club of Remuera

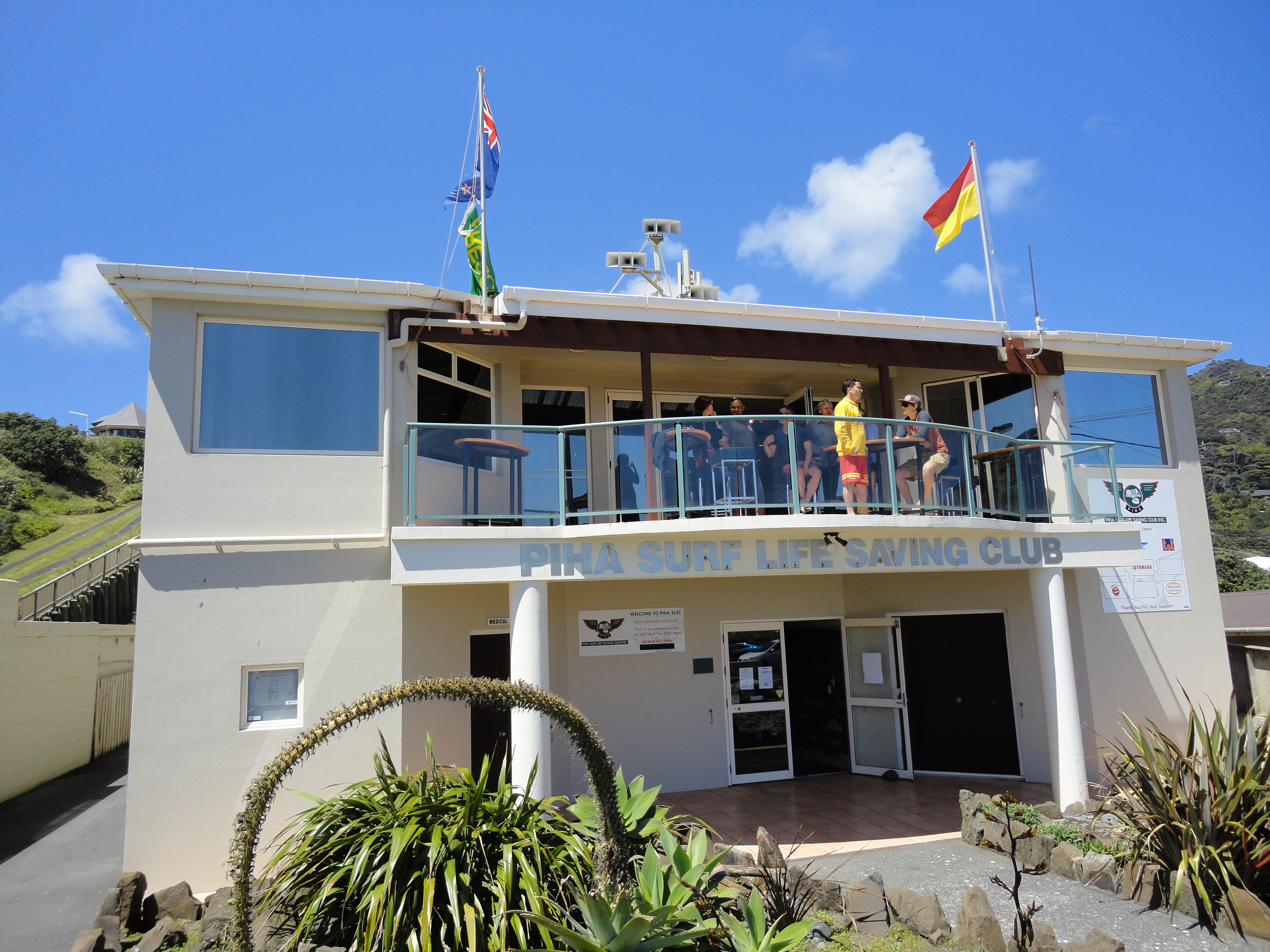
Piha Surf Life Saving Club - Clubhouse October 2013

== Rescue and bravery awards ==
=== Meritorious Award for Bravery in Bronze, 1963. ===
Lifeguard: Don (E. D.) Wright

=== Wales Bank Outstanding Rescue of the Year Award, 1980. ===
Lifeguard: Murray Bray

=== Meritorious Award for Bravery, 1984. ===
Lifeguards: Murray Bray and George Thomson

=== Piha Lifeguard Service, BP Surf Rescue of the Year, 2001. ===
Lifeguards: Nick Kinghorn and Graham Valentine.

=== Rescue of the Month, March 2008. ===
Awarded to Piha and United North Piha Life Guards for their combined rescue and advanced scene management.

Life Guards involved: Abbi Manley, Cali Manley, Liz Manley, Vanda Karolczak, Paul Picot, Gary Turton, Ukiah Brown, Tony Featherstone (PC), Paul Downey, Jason Anderson, Merrin O'Brien, Jess Hosking, Jonathon Webber, Geoff Calvert, Hayley Seymour, Leif Neilson, Brent Airey.

=== Rescue of the Month, November 2009 ===
Lifeguards: Duncan Clarke, Geoff Calvert and Rob Wakelin.

=== Rescue of the Month, February 2010. ===
Lifeguards involved: Jonathon Webber, Greg Wilson, Anna Schubert, Murray Bray, Mike Wood, Chase Cahalane.

=== Rescue of the Month, February 2012. ===
Regional Lifeguards Involved: Logan Adams, Kris O'Neill, Duncan Buchanan, Tommy Cantrell, Sam Bassett, Aaron Young, Anaru Clarke, Tom Jacka, Sam Jenkins.

=== Rescue of the Month, October 2012. ===
Lifeguards involved: Paul Picot, Alice Seagar, Paul Downey, Jason Anderson, Tony Featherstone, Tony Adams, Olivia Adams, Christian Robertson, Vanda Karolczak, Mikaela Ryan, Anna Karolczak Young, Roger Wallis, Jordan Pope, Eric Morighan and Ukiah Brown.

=== Rescue of the Month, September 2013. ===
Lifeguards involved: Duncan Clarke, Aramis Goodwin and Geoff Calvert.

== Reel line and belt ==
The reel line and belt method of surf rescue was developed by clubbies at Bondi Beach, Australia. The first belts were fitted with cork floats that limited the swimmers ability to dive under approaching waves. The Ross Safety Belt which had a pin that could be pulled in an emergency to release the swimmer was introduced to Piha in 1947.

During a rescue, the swimmer quickly donned the belt and headed into the surf, the reel was carried to near the water's edge and the reel-man and the lines-men paid out the line as the swimmer headed towards the patient. The best swimmers in the club were used as belt-men. If there was a sideways rip and too much line was payed out, the swim became very arduous. Once the patient had been reached and secured, the belt-man raised his arm to signal that he was ready to be pulled in. The linesmen hauled hand over hand on the line as the reel man wound in the line.

== Surf boats ==
Piha Surf Life Saving Club pioneered the use of surf rescue boats in New Zealand, with the country's first surf boat, launched in 1936. On 9 April 1939 the first ever surf boat race held in New Zealand took place at Piha Beach with Piha winning against Wainui Club. In 1940 a Piha crew comprising Tom Pearce, Haden Way, Max Cleary, Jack Rae and Tiger O'Brien rowing in a randomly allocated boat were the inaugural winners of the National Surf Boat Championship Series, held at Wellington's Lyall Bay.

In 1967 Sir Jack Butland of Butland Industries provided the surf boat Piha built by Bailey Bros of Sydney to the club. In 1971 Sir Jack provided the club with Miss Chesdale. Another boat Ches'n' Dale was dedicated in 1979. More Ches'n'Dale boats followed, with numbers three and four donated in 1985.

Piha won the gruelling Tuakua Sands River Race, from Tuakau to Port Waikato in 1983, 1984, 1985 and 1986. In various competitions during 1987 Piha accumulated 33 wins and 2 seconds. In 1985 at Mount Maunganui a Piha crew comprising Steve Booten, Mike MacDonald, Peter Digan, Mark McCarthny and Mike Zainey as sweep became the first New Zealand "Test" Crew to beat Australia.

The first attempt at rowing a surf boat from Onehunga to Piha over the unpredictable and treacherous Manukau Heads Bar was made in April 1971. It was decided to negotiate the north channel as the safer south channel used by shipping would have added another seven kilometers to the row. As the crew (Andy Sekula, Mike Zainey, Ray Markham, Brian Sullivan and Alan Foubister) rowed down the narrow northern channel, huge swells came up and the channel petered out leaving the boat in the suf zone. There was no route to get through the surf line leaving no option but to wait for a lull and head for the beach on a wave. The boat hit the beach with such force that the keel was split in half and all the ribs in the boat were broken. Despite the boat being a write off, sponsorship for the row and publicity gained about $2,000 for the club. The feat of getting all the way to Piha was only accomplished in 1992 with a crew comprising George Thompson, Brett Sullivan, Martin Wienk, Johan Broekhuizen, Duane Rice and Geoff Calvert rowing Lend Lease. The trip took over five hours in high swells and stiff winds. At one stage in this row George Thomson was thrown overboard after the surf boat hit a three-meter-high (9.8 ft) swell.

The first Piha Big Wave Classic (Day of the Giants) was held at Piha Beach in April 2005 with 12 crews on the beach. Piha came second in the open men's race. These races, held annually are part of the national surf life-saving championship surf boat series. In 2007 three Australian crews (Bronte, Jan Juc and Austinmer) competed in these races. In 2014 Piha became the first club to win the trifecta at Piha - Open Men's, Open Women's and Under 23 Men. The Big Wave Classic is held at Piha near the end of February every year, depending on tides.

In 2008 Piha crews comprising James Dallinger, Brad Mytton, Hayden Smith, Craig Knox, Matt Kirke, Mark Bourneville and Bruce O'Brien won the European Open Surf Boat Championships (also known as the World Surf Rowing Championships) at Biarritz, France. In 2012 The Piha A crew of Matt Kirke, Paul Gerritsen, Ben Scott, Scott Lissington, Chris Morris and swept by Mark Bournville won the New Zealand Short and Long Course titles, the New Zealand Surf Boat Series, the ERCs, the Auckland Championships Short and Long Course titles. They also travelled to Australia and became the first-ever New Zealand crew to win the Aussie Open title, that same weekend they competed against the Australian men's crew in the battle of the ditch which Piha also won.

In 2013 Piha became the first club to win 5 Golds at a New Zealand National Surf Life Saving Championships (Open Men long and short courses, Under 23 Men long and short courses and under 19 Men long course).

At the 2014 New Zealand Nationals Phia A became the first crew to win 8 New Zealand titles in five consecutive seasons. The under 23 crew also scored a first - the first to win 5 New Zealand National titles in the under 23 division. The club also became the first to win 4 of the 6 divisional New Zealand Surf Boat Series titles - Men's Open, Women's Open, Under 23 Men's and Under 19 Women.

The current Piha surf boats, sponsored by Burger Fuel and Trillian Trust, are named after previous Piha boaties:- Tom Pearce, E D Wright, Buddy Lucas and Tiger O'Brien.

== Piha "tear-drop" surf rescue ski ==
Piha Surf Life Saving club acquired a surf ski from Australia in 1936 and used it for several rescues that season. However these narrow, 12-foot-long skis made from mahogany and plywood did not stand up to the tough Piha surf conditions. E D "Don" Wright, who joined the club in 1940, by trial and error developed the Piha Tear-Drop Surf Rescue Ski. These skis designed for carrying a patient in the surf at Piha were wider than the Australian ones, about 12 feet long, half-circle-shaped at the front and taped to "nothing" at the tail. These skis were used by the club until the 1970s.

== Rescue helicopter service ==
The Auckland Rescue Helicopter Service was started by the Auckland Surf Life Saving Association leasing a Hiller 12E helicopter from Alexander Helicopters Ltd for six summer weekends in 1970/1971. The helicopter flown by George Sobiecke was based on the hill behind the Piha Surf Life Saving Club. From 1971 on, the rescue helicopter service operated during the surf life saving club patrolling season from Labour Weekend to Easter. A Rescue Helicopter Squad of 32 specially trained lifeguards from the various clubs affiliated to the Auckland Surf Life Saving Association was formed. Pilot George Sobieke departed in 1972 and was replaced by Sam Anderson. Surf reports were radioed from the helicopter for live broadcast over Radio Hauraki.

In January 1973 the Hiller 12E was replaced by a jet engine powered Hiller FH1100. Apart from weekends this helicopter was also used during the summer school holidays and had one of the Helicopter Squad Members working as a Paid Helicopter Lifeguard for this period. Money raised from surf reports provided by the duty Helicopter Lifeguards was used to purchase and redecorate a building on the middle beach at Piha. This became the summer base for the rescue helicopter crew with a landing pad to the north of the Piha Middle Beach toilet block.

In 1977 Keith McKenzie succeeded Sam Anderson as the pilot. On 8 January 1977 the prime minister Rob Muldoon was at Piha for the re-opening of the Piha Surf Life Saving club house after the Project 40 rebuild. Muldoon joined the helicopter lifeguards to jump into the surf and be lifted out of the water and transported back to the beach, slung under the helicopter using the rescue strop connected into the cargo hook.

== Jet rescue boats ==
The first jet rescue boat stationed at Piha, the Sir John Logan Campbell, was dedicated by Sir Dove-Meyer Robinson on 2 December 1974 to coincide with the club's 40th anniversary. The boat was launched into deeper water beside the Pakiti rocks at the Southern end of the beach. A second boat, Lady Cambell, was added a few years later. Both boats were powered by three stage Hamilton jet units which enabled them to manoeuvre in shallow water and around swimmers without any of the risks of conventional propellers.

== Inflatable rescue boats (or IRBs) ==
Club member Don "Bluey" Wright was the New Zealand powercraft officer from 1976 to 1979. Development and operation of jet rescue boats had been pushed as far as they could go and needed highly qualified crew, were expensive to maintain and operate and sometimes had problems during launch and retrieval.

The Schweppes Powercraft Congress was held at Piha in 1976 and introduced many clubs in New Zealand to the value and capabilities of IRBs. Don Wright and the Speights family worked together to develop the Arancia inflatable rescue boat with the Mk I Arancia IRB being tested at Piha in November 1978. During this test the first ever rescue of a swimmer washed up on rocks occurred. Wright was experienced with boats and along with others including Rob Ferguson, Murray Wood, Basil Vertongen, Loius Jordian, John Hosiaux spent much time getting the engines and hulls right and promoting their use. Bluey Wright introduced qualifications for drivers and crew. Out-of-season IRB Rescue Competitions began at Piha. In 1981 Bluey and his son Tony won two of three events at the first Europa IRB Nationals which were held at Piha.

By 1981 50% of all surf rescues in New Zealand were performed by IRBs. IRBs feature in the TV series Piha Rescue.

== Piha Juniors - Nipper Life Guards ==
In the early 1950s, Piha Juniors under the instruction of Ron "Snooper" Cooper were called the "young un's". The Juniors soon became the front line guards due to work commitments of the Senior Guards. Don "Bluey" Wright 1955–1956 took the Juniors. Buddy Lucas from 1971. Gordon Barker assisted by Ken Morris 1975–1983. This was the start of the Nipper movement. In July 1994 23 Juniors travelled to Huntington Beach, Los Angeles, California for training.

== Sponsors ==
Piha Surf Life Saving Club is supported by :

Major Sponsors: Nissan, Burger Fuel, Trillian Trust Inc, Coverstaff Recruitment, NZCT Sport, Blue Sky Community Trust, Sir John Logan Campbell Residuary Estate, Kelliher Charitable Trust, Yamaha New Zealand, ASB Community Trust, The Trust Community Foundation (TTCF), Infinity Foundation Ltd, Isuzu, Explorer New Zealand, Freshmax

Sponsors: Brown Cleaning Solutions, Ross Mullins - Sound developments, Jagermeistter, Tomizone, Fulton Hogan, Remuera Lions, BFG Bourneville Furniture Group, Fonterra

Project 80 Partners: Hulena Architects Ltd, Campbell Brown Planning Ltd, Harrison Grierson, Operating Partners Ltd, Piha SLSC Fund Trust, hlkjacob, Consult QS.

== New Zealand honours ==
- Sir Alex McKenzie
- Jim T Wakelin MNZM
- Denis F Black ONZM
- Rodger L Curtice QSM

== Australian Surf Life Saving Championships ==
Medals won by Piha SLSC at the Australian Surf Life Saving Championships include:

- 2012 - Gold, Piha A Crew, Battle of the Ditch Surfboat Race- New Zealand versus Australia (Ben Scott, Matt Kirke, Paul Gerritsen, Chris Morris, Sweep: Mark Bourneville)
- 2012 - Gold, Piha A Crew, Australian Surf Rowers League (ASRL) Open Surfboat Race (Ben Scott, Matt Kirke, Paul Gerritsen, Scott Lissington, Sweep: Mark Bourneville)

== World & European Surf Life Saving Championships ==
Medals won by the Piha SLSC at World Surf Lifesaving Championships include:

- 2008 - Gold, European Open Surf Boat Champions, Biarritz, France (James Dallinger, Brad Mytton, Hayden Smith, Craig Knox, Matt Kirke, Bruce O'Brien, Sweep: Mark Bourneville)
- 2012 - Gold, Piha 140 Masters Crew, Surfboat Race (Craig Knox, Bruce O’Brien, Matt Kirke, Wayne Simeon, Sweep: Mark Bourneville )
- 2012 - Gold, Piha Reserve Crew, Surfboat Race (Craig Knox, Bruce O’Brien, Scott Lissington, Chris Eade, Sweep: Mark Bourneville )
- 2012 - Silver, Piha Pistols, Under 23 Crew, Surfboat Race (Ludovik Bourneville, Cedric Bourneville, Ben Richards, Jean Paul Smit, Oliver Sawbridge, Sweep: Mark Bourneville )
- 2012 - Silver, Piha Crews, World Club Champions
- 2014 - Gold, Under 23 Women's Surfboat Race, Piha Coladas (Nicole Hogarth, Claudia Goff, Audrey-lise Bourneville, Grace Monteith, Mark Bourneville)
- 2014 - Silver, Under 23 Men Surfboat Race, Piha Pistols (Ludovick Bourneville, Cameron Sweetman, Benjamin Kieley, Cedrick Bourneville, Mark Bourneville)
- 2014 - Silver, Masters 120+ Surfboat Race, Piha Pearls (Maria Haitsma, Annelies Visser, Joanna Fyfe, Lauren Kavanagh, Mark Bouirneville)
