= Buddy Lucas (swimmer) =

New Zealand swimmer (1931–2002)

Personal information
- Full name: Frederick Ross Lucas
- Born: 22 May 1931 Auckland, New Zealand
- Died: 18 October 2002 (aged 71) Auckland, New Zealand
- Relatives: Fred Lucas (father)

Sport
- Sport: Swimming
- Strokes: Freestyle
- College team: University of Iowa
Medal record
Men's swimming
Representing New Zealand
British Empire Games
Gold medal – first place	1950 Auckland	880 y Freestyle Relay
Silver medal – second place	1954 Vancouver	330 y Medley Relay
Bronze medal – third place	1950 Auckland	440 yards Freestyle
Bronze medal – third place	1950 Auckland	1650 yards Freestyle

Frederick Ross "Buddy" Lucas (22 May 1931 – 18 October 2002) was a New Zealand swimmer and surf lifesaver.

== Biography ==
Lucas was born in Auckland in 1931, the son of All Black Fred Lucas. He was educated at Mt Albert Grammar School, where he excelled at rugby and swimming.

At the 1950 British Empire Games he won a gold medal as part of the men's 880 yards Freestyle Relay and two bronze medals in the 440 and 1650 yards freestyle races.

Lucas won a swimming scholarship to the University of Iowa in 1951, becoming the first New Zealander to win a sports scholarship to the United States. Lucas travelled to Iowa via the United Kingdom, where he won the 220 yards and 440 yards freestyle events at the British championships. In 1952, despite being rated the second-best swimmer in the British Empire, his nomination for the New Zealand team for the Helsinki Olympics was rejected.

In 1954 at the Vancouver British Empire and Commonwealth Games Lucas won a silver medal as part of the men's 330 yards medley relay.

After his return to New Zealand from Iowa in 1957, Lucas worked in his father's menswear store in Queen Street, Auckland, and later was a sales representative for May & Baker. He was active in surf lifesaving, having joined the Piha Surf Life Saving Club in 1944, and served as the club's president for 16 years. In 1958 he won the men's open individual surf race at the New Zealand national surf lifesaving championships.

Lucas died in Auckland in 2002 after a short illness.

== See also ==
- List of Commonwealth Games medallists in swimming (men)
