= Lifeguard =

Profession

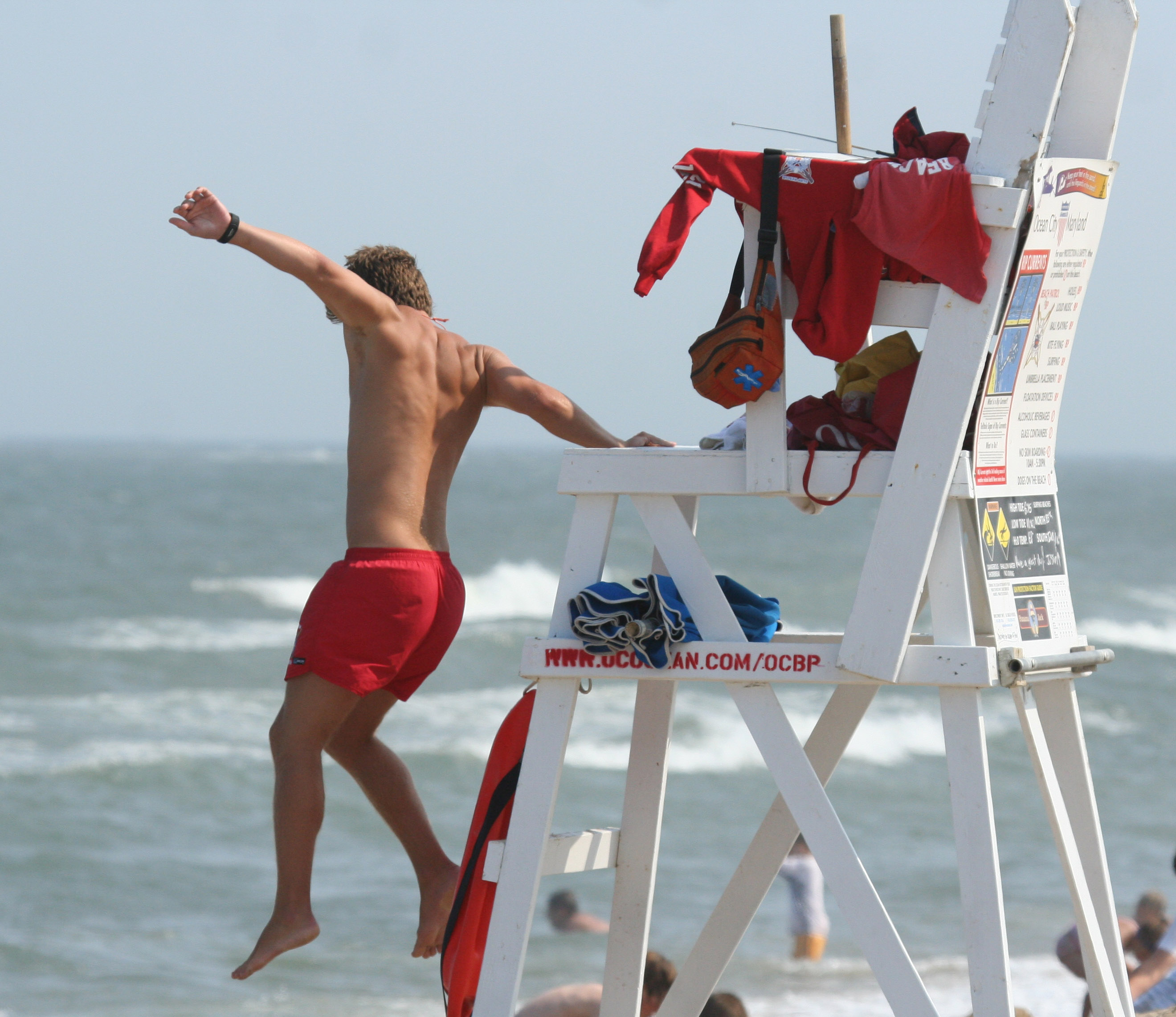
A lifeguard jumping from a lifeguard tower at Ocean City, Maryland

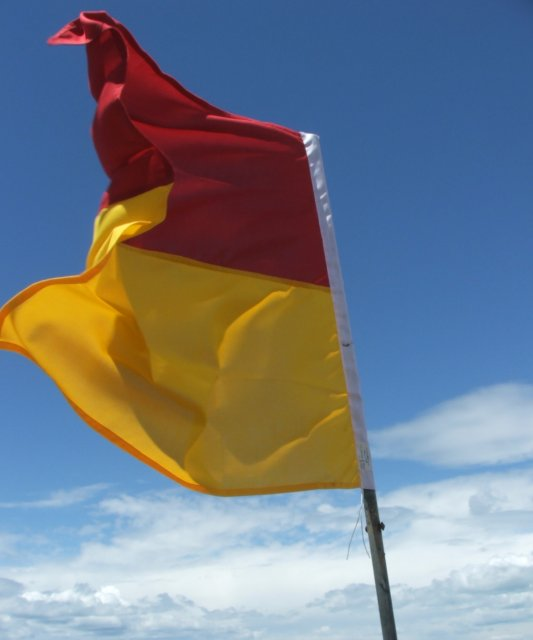
Red and yellow flag indicating a bathing area patrolled by lifeguards

A lifeguard is a rescuer who supervises the safety and rescue of swimmers, surfers, and other water sports participants such as in a swimming pool, water park, beach, spa, river and lake. Lifeguards are trained in swimming and CPR/AED first aid, certified in water rescue using a variety of aids and equipment depending on requirements of their particular venue. In some areas, lifeguards are part of the emergency services system to incidents and in some communities, lifeguards may function as the primary EMS provider.

== Responsibilities ==
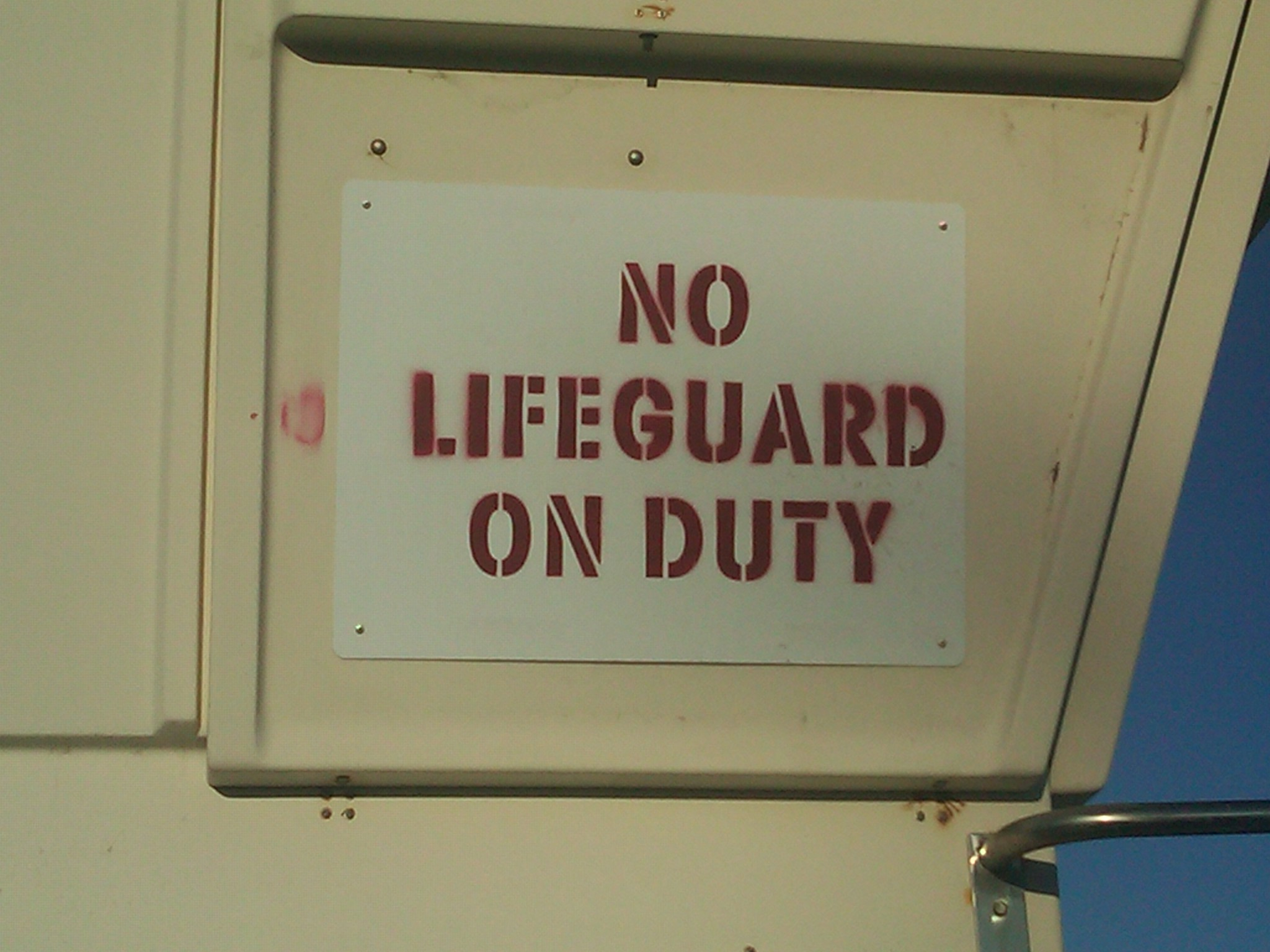
Picture of a lifeguard warning sign taken in Santa Barbara, California, in 2011

A lifeguard is responsible for the safety of people in an area of water, and usually a defined area immediately surrounding or adjacent to it, such as a beach next to an ocean or lake. The priority is to ensure no harm comes to users of the area for which they are responsible. Lifeguards often take on this responsibility upon employment, however, there may also be volunteer lifeguards.

The conditions resulting in drowning are summarized by the 'drowning chain' in which each link can lead directly to an incident, or contribute to a succession of links. It consists of lack of education about water safety or local conditions, a lack of safety advice (for example, about rip currents at a beach) a lack of protection (like no flotation device for a weak swimmer), lack of safety supervision, or an inability to cope with conditions (strong surf with a weak swimmer).

The drowning chain

The drowning chain provides a clear basis for preventing drowning which includes:

- Education and information
- Provision of warnings
- Denial of access
- Supervision
- Training in survival skills

The lifeguard is able to provide all these elements to help prevent drownings (or other incidents) in their area of responsibility, and for this reason this should be the primary focus of a lifeguard's activities, as it is better to stop an incident from occurring rather than reacting once it has occurred. This means that the effectiveness of a lifeguard unit can be measured not by the number or rapidity of rescues, or the skill with which they are executed, but by the absence or reduction of drownings, accidents and other medical emergencies. Prevention is an effective skill that is vitally important to a lifeguard because it can aid in maintaining the safety of the aquatic patrons.

== Duties ==
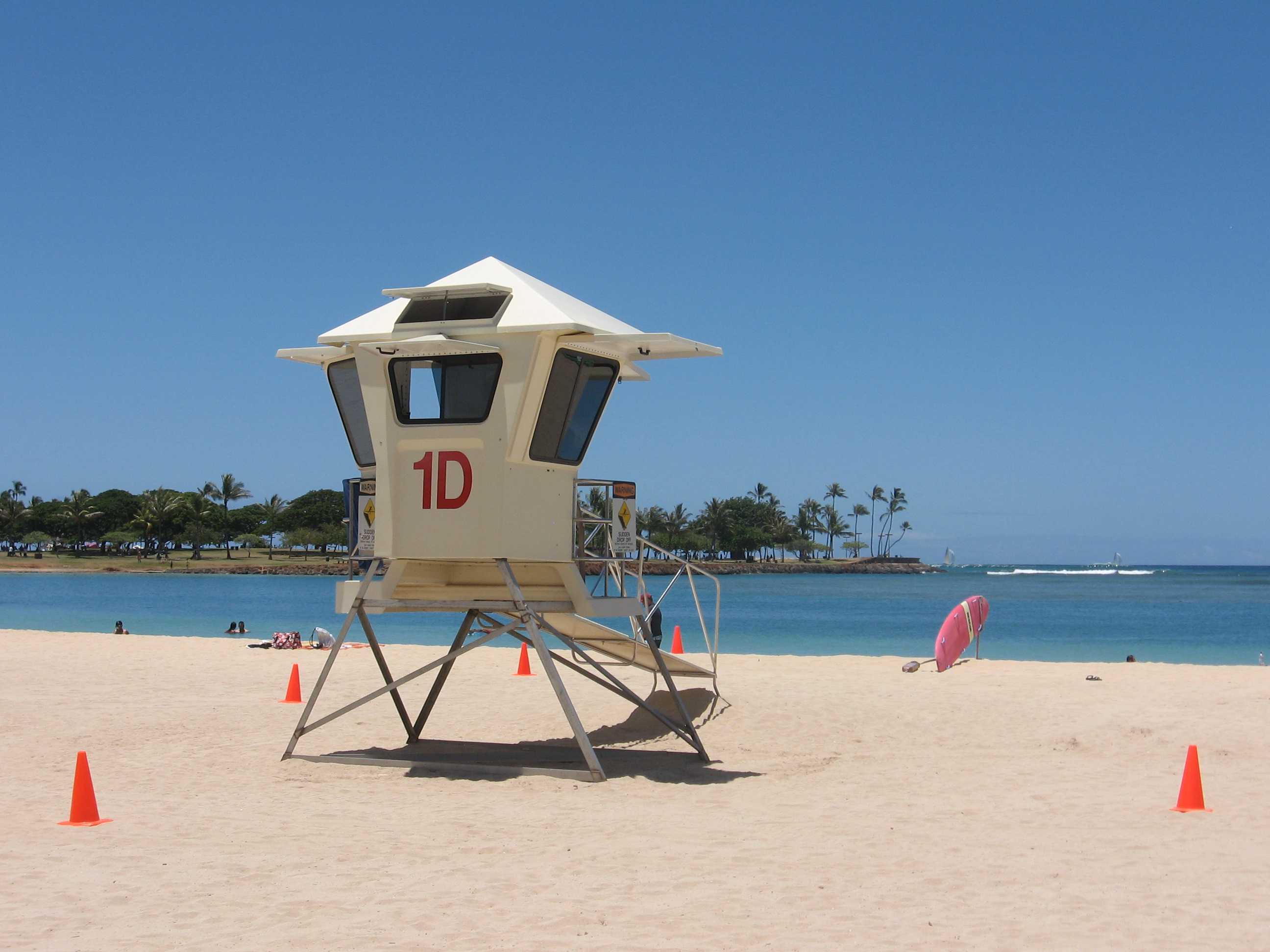
An enclosed lifeguard tower at Ala Moana Beach, Honolulu, Hawaii

A lifeguard's key duties (usually as part of a team, but in some places, lifeguards may be required to work on their own) are to:

- Enforce rules to prevent problems/injuries
- Maintain concentrated observation of the duty area and its users in to anticipate problems (this will enable the lifeguard to intervene with one of the drowning prevention measures) and to identify an emergency quickly.
- Supervise the use of other equipment when allocated to that duty (such as water slides or any other activities taking place)
- Effect rescues and initiate other emergency action as necessary
- Give immediate first aid in the event of injury to a bather or other incident
- Communicate with bathers and other users to fulfill the above tasks
- Help clean areas around pool or beach to ensure the safety of patrons

Lifeguards may have other secondary duties such as cleaning, filing paperwork, checking a swimming pool's chlorine and pH levels, or acting as a general information point. It is important that lifeguards never allow their secondary responsibilities to interfere with their primary responsibilities.

Lifeguards may also be required to attend in-service meetings to discuss strategy, patron safety and water skills.

The California State Lifeguards, a division of the California State Parks Peace Officer department, perform law enforcement duties in addition to regular lifeguard tasks.

== Training ==
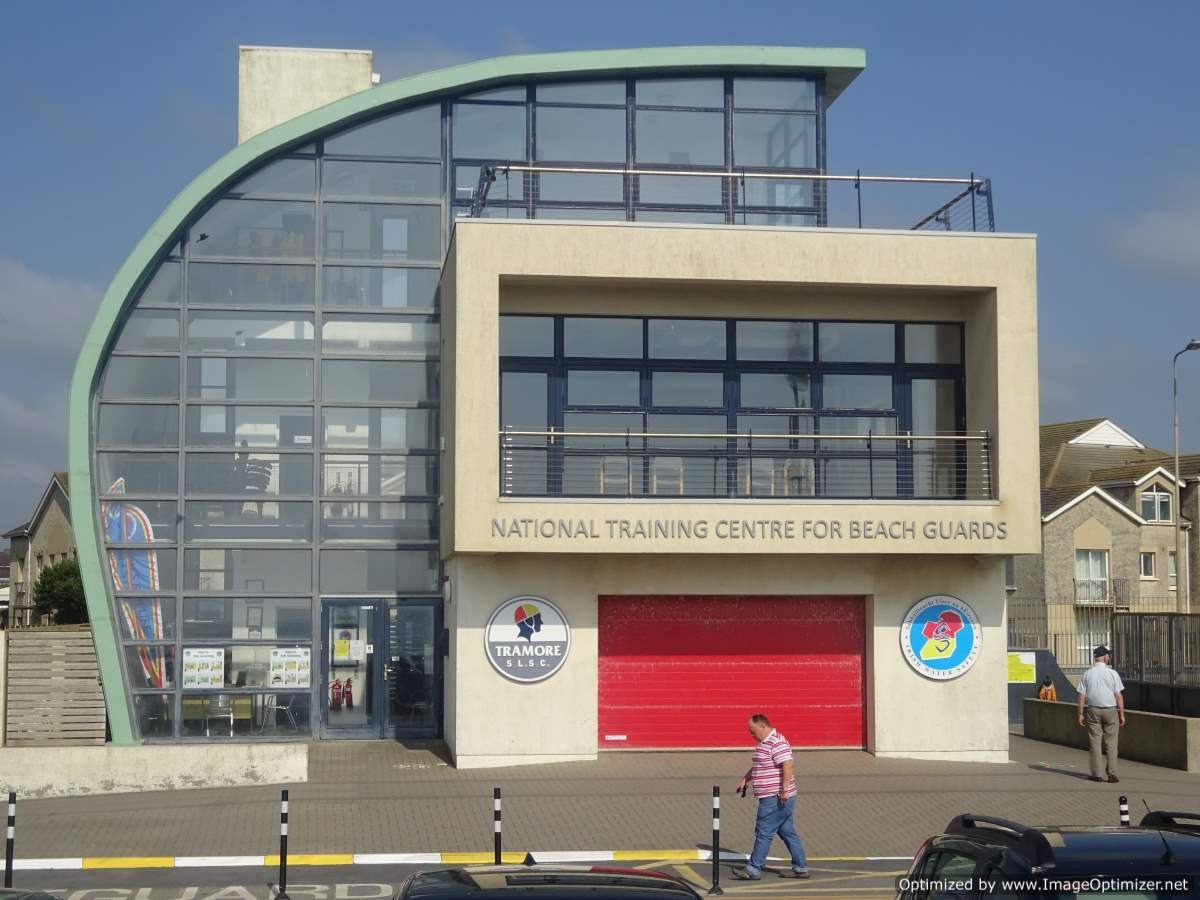
National Training Centre for Beach Guards, Tramore, Ireland

Every lifeguard has to undergo a certification course in order to be able to work as a lifeguard. Certain certification companies, such as the Red Cross or Ellis and Associates, are in charge of the certification process. Certification usually lasts for 1–2 years, but can last up to 5. Classes last 25–30 hours and will generally be held over a few days, with the hours per day varying depending on the number of days needed. At the end of the certification class, lifeguards are required to take a final exam, and will only receive a certificate if they pass the final exam. Lifeguards are then required to do additional training throughout the duration of their certification at the discretion of the facility they work for.

Most skills taught in various lifeguard certification classes are similar or the same, but some skills may vary minorly based on the certification company. Additionally, different in-water skills will be taught depending on the facility certifying the lifeguard, i.e., shallow/deep water pools, water parks, beaches, etc.

Training equipment required in certification classes include:

- Rescue tubes
- Backboards
- CPR mannequins
- Resuscitation masks
- Bag-valve masks
- Disposable gloves
- AED Trainer
- First aid supplies

Some of the various out-of-water skills taught are:

- Cardiopulmonary resuscitation (CPR) – A series of chest compressions and ventilations that try to circulate blood containing oxygen throughout the body to vital organs in an attempt to resuscitate a victim.
- First aid – The lifeguard in training should know how to protect themselves from blood borne pathogens. Lifeguards should protect themselves at all times when performing first aid.
- Emergency oxygen administration – Provides emergency oxygen therapy for victims with breathing and cardiac emergencies.
- In-line stabilization – A technique used for suspected spinal injuries both in and out of the water that uses the arms to stabilize the head and prevent further movement that could worsen the head, neck, or spinal injury.
- Active and unconscious choking – Active choking measures make use of back blows and abdominal thrusts to try to force out the object blocking the victim's airway; Unconscious choking measures are similar to CPR with a few small changes.
- Various first aid skills – Used to treat various injuries and sudden illnesses that can occur.
- Legal Issues – lifeguards must learn how to legally care for guests and/or guests in distress, otherwise they may be a liability. The certification process and further trainings will instruct lifeguards on the legal facets of lifeguarding: duty to care, standard of care, negligence, consent, refusal of care, abandonment, confidentiality, and documentation.
- Emergency Action Plans – each facility will have an established protocol in the event of an emergency. The details of this protocol are decided by the facility.

Some of the various in-water skills taught are:

- Active-victim rescue – An active victim rescue is designed to quickly remove and calm a victim from the water. Depending on whether the victim is facing towards or facing away from the rescuer, the rescue will change.
- Active-victim front rescue – A common rescue, when a victim is facing the rescuer, is to straighten the arms and push the victim to the side of the pool. The space the straightened arms give between the rescuer and the victim will prevent a victim from latching on to the rescuer. When approaching an active drowning victim from the rear, a common save is to perform a 'hooking' maneuver, where rescuers hook their arms under the victim's arm pits and begin extraction.
- Passive-victim rescue – Saving and removing a victim who is passive (or not moving) in the water; There are variations for both shallow and deep water
- Spinal rescue – A rescue that assumes a victim has a head, neck, or spinal injury and uses more appropriate measures to ensure that no unnecessary movement creates further harm to the victim. There are variations for both shallow and deep water.

=== Prerequisites ===
Most lifeguard certification companies require potential lifeguards to demonstrate strong swimming skills prior to the certification process. These prerequisites will usually include a mid-distance swim, a timed water tread, and diving for a weighted brick at the bottom of the pool.

=== Ongoing Trainings ===
Many aquatic facilities will have their lifeguards undergo additional Lifeguard Training Classes for the duration of their certification. The nature and frequency of these additional training depends on the aquatic facility and the certification company the aquatic facility follows. For example, a beach facility may practice beachfront saves and search-and-rescue scenarios, where an indoor pool facility whose lifeguards are responsible for the whole building may practice scenarios that simulate emergencies in different parts of the building. These in-service trainings are meant to serve as practice in order to maintain and develop skills taught during the certification process. Examples of these trainings include First Aid/CPR/AED skill review and Aquatic Emergency Action Plan Drills.

Additionally, some certification companies outside of the facility may audit or examine lifeguards during their rotations. These visits are meant to serve as both a test of preparedness and also as a learning experience and a chance to improve on weaker skills. Visits are generally unannounced and may include videoing of on-duty lifeguards, skills evaluations involving a scenario meant to model real life, and vigilance awareness testing.

Lifeguards also must be recertified regularly, as lifeguard certifications expire after some time.

== Water entries ==
There are four main types of water entries:

- Slide-in is the slowest of the four entries. This technique is used when a victim has a suspected head, neck, or spinal injury.
- Stride jump should only be used in water depth of five feet or more and the lifeguard should be no higher than three feet above ground.
- Compact jump can be used from the side of the pool or from the lifeguard chair. The pool depth should be at least five feet if jumping from an elevated position.
- Run-and-swim is used in shallow waters that go from zero-depth to at least three feet.

These entries are used in different scenarios depending on if the victim is passive, or conscious, whether they are in deep or shallow water, and if they have a potential head, neck or spinal injury.

== Identifying types of swimmer ==
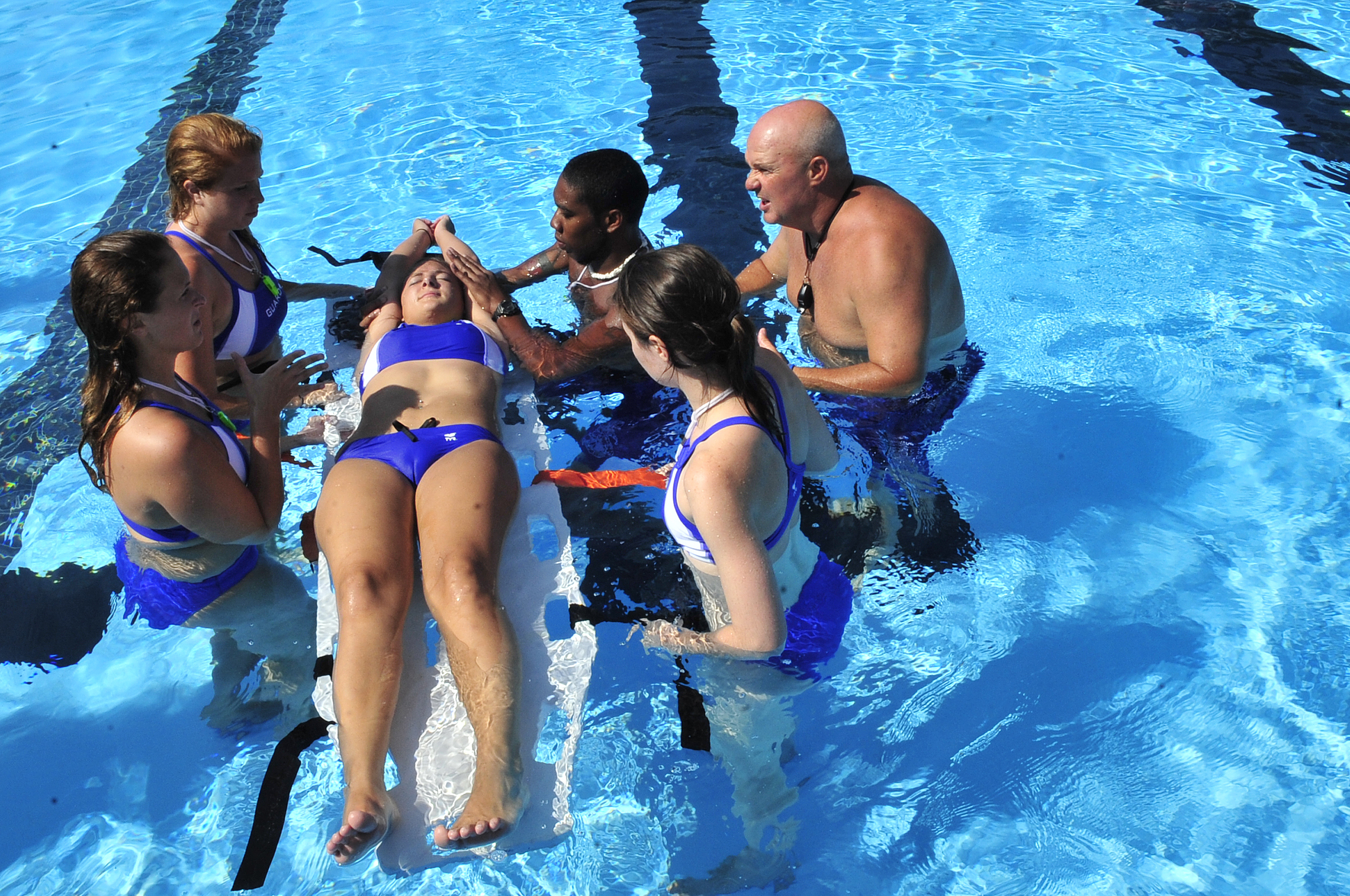
U.S. military personnel undergo lifeguard training / spinal injury recovery via backboard.

While performing patron surveillance (usually from an elevated stand or a water-level standing or sitting position) lifeguards watch for and recognize struggling or drowning swimmers, and swimmers with sudden medical conditions such as a stroke, heart attack, asthma, diabetes, or seizures. Lifeguards look for swimmers in various categories and conditions:

1. Passive drowning person are inactive in the water, submerged or otherwise. When a lifeguard sees this kind of swimmer they perform an emergency rescue.
2. Active drowning person are taking in water while attempting to stay at the surface. Common signs lifeguards look for include looking for arms moving or flapping laterally (in an effort to press down on the water and leverage the head above the water's surface), not necessarily flailing, with the body vertical, no supporting kick, and no forwards progress. This behavior is known as the instinctive drowning response. Lifeguards perform an emergency rescue to assist this kind of swimmer as their behavior results from being incapable of more active efforts to survive. They may be less than 60 seconds from sinking underwater.
3. Distressed swimmers are having trouble swimming, perhaps from fatigue, and may or may not be calling out for help. Lifeguards usually swim out and help these swimmers to the side. They may or may not require additional assistance.
4. Normal swimmers (healthy swimmers) are those who do not need any support and can swim on their own doing intermediate strokes (swimming standards).

== Locations ==
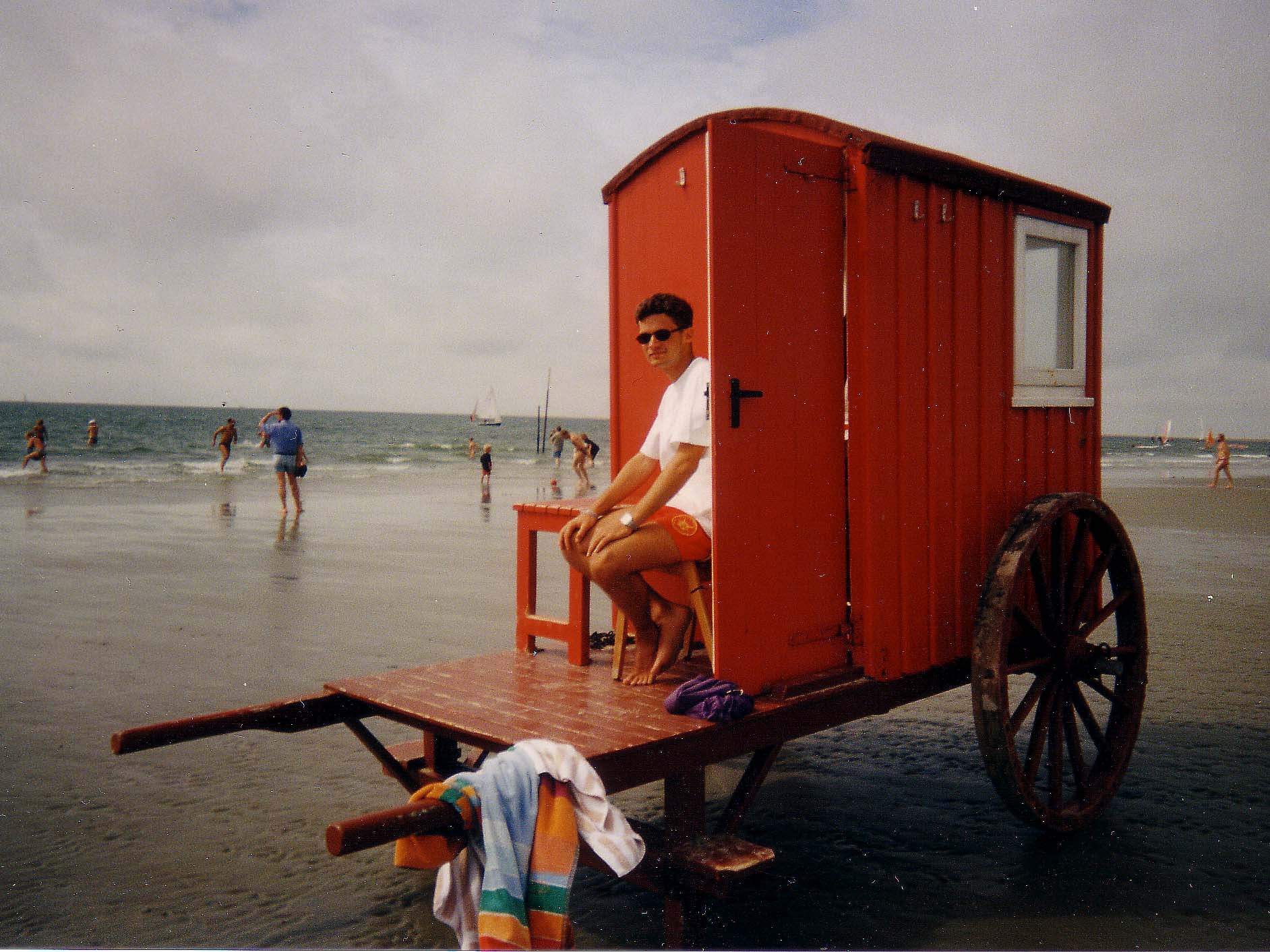
Lifeguard on duty, Borkum in the North Sea

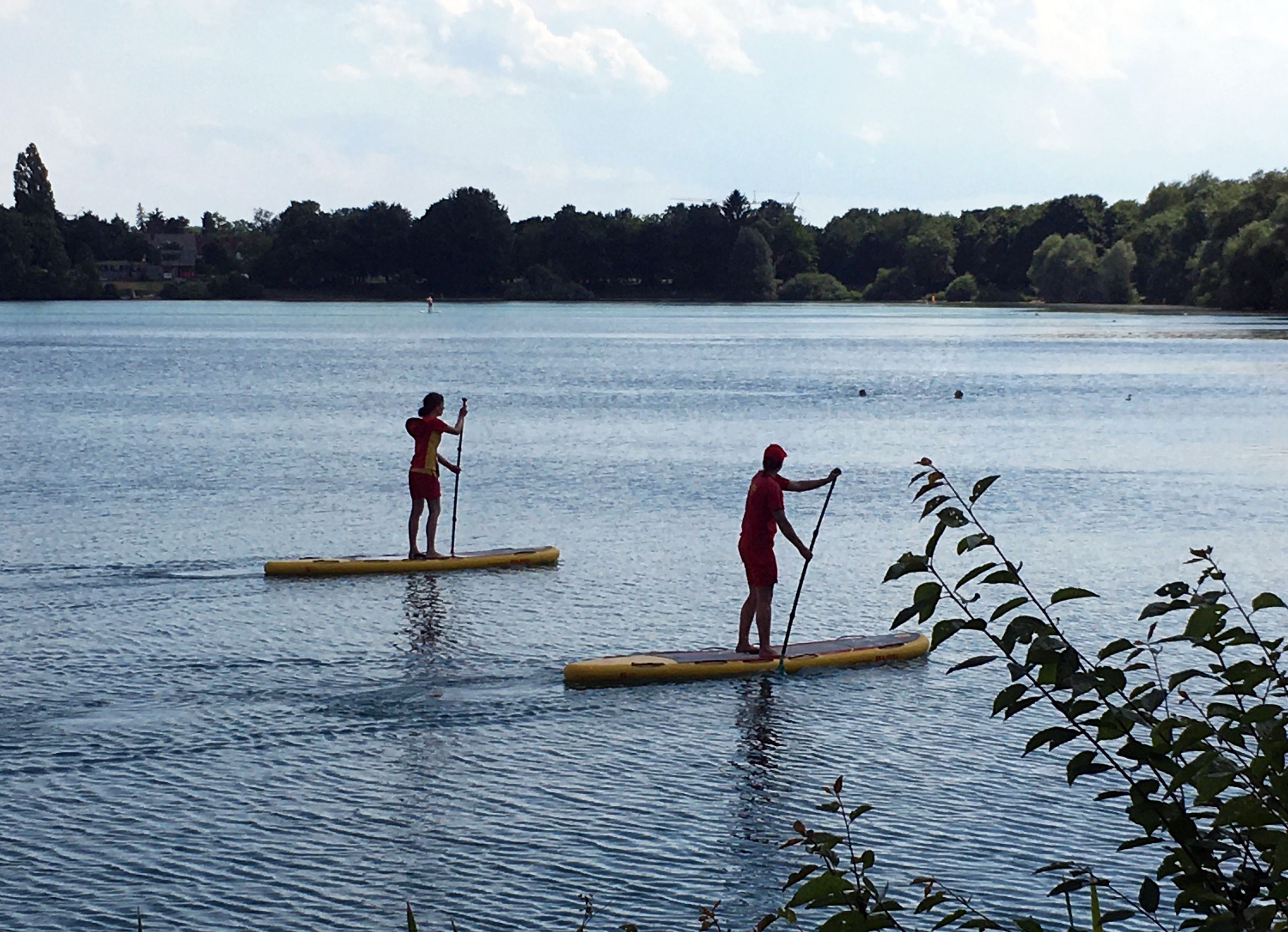
Two lifeguards of the German DLRG patrolling a public bathing area of a lake on stand-up paddleboards in Munich

Lifeguards can be found patrolling many different types of water, and each type has its own unique features, duties and challenges. Locations where lifeguards can be found include:

- Ocean beach – Lifeguards are commonly associated with beaches on the seashore, and this is often considered the most challenging environment to lifeguard due to the influence of external factors such as weather, currents, tides and waves. Lifeguards have to be in peak physical condition in order to accommodate these conditions. Lifeguards are required to complete additional training to be able to service ocean beach areas.
- Inland body of water (Waterfront) – Lifeguards can also look after open water areas such as rivers, or even lakes or ponds where swimmers may congregate.
- Swimming pool – Swimming pools of various sizes are often monitored by lifeguards, however some pools may not require monitoring as due to the size of the pool, or the patron attendance being too low. A sign indicating that "Lifeguard not on duty" will be present in this case.
  - Water park – Whilst water parks are a type of swimming pool, they can be considered a unique type of facility as they may involve additional features such as water slides or wave generators, or shallow pool play areas
  - Ocean lagoon or tidal pool – These enclosed areas use seawater, but like a pool have a limited and contained area, but have the potential for additional hazards above and beyond an artificial pool
  - Waterfront – Lifeguards can look after in a non-surf, open-water areas such as lakes, rivers, streams, and lagoons that are found at public parks, resorts, summer camps and campgrounds.
- Open ocean – In some cases, people may swim in the open ocean from a boat (such as a cruise ship) and lifeguards may be employed for safety in this instance.

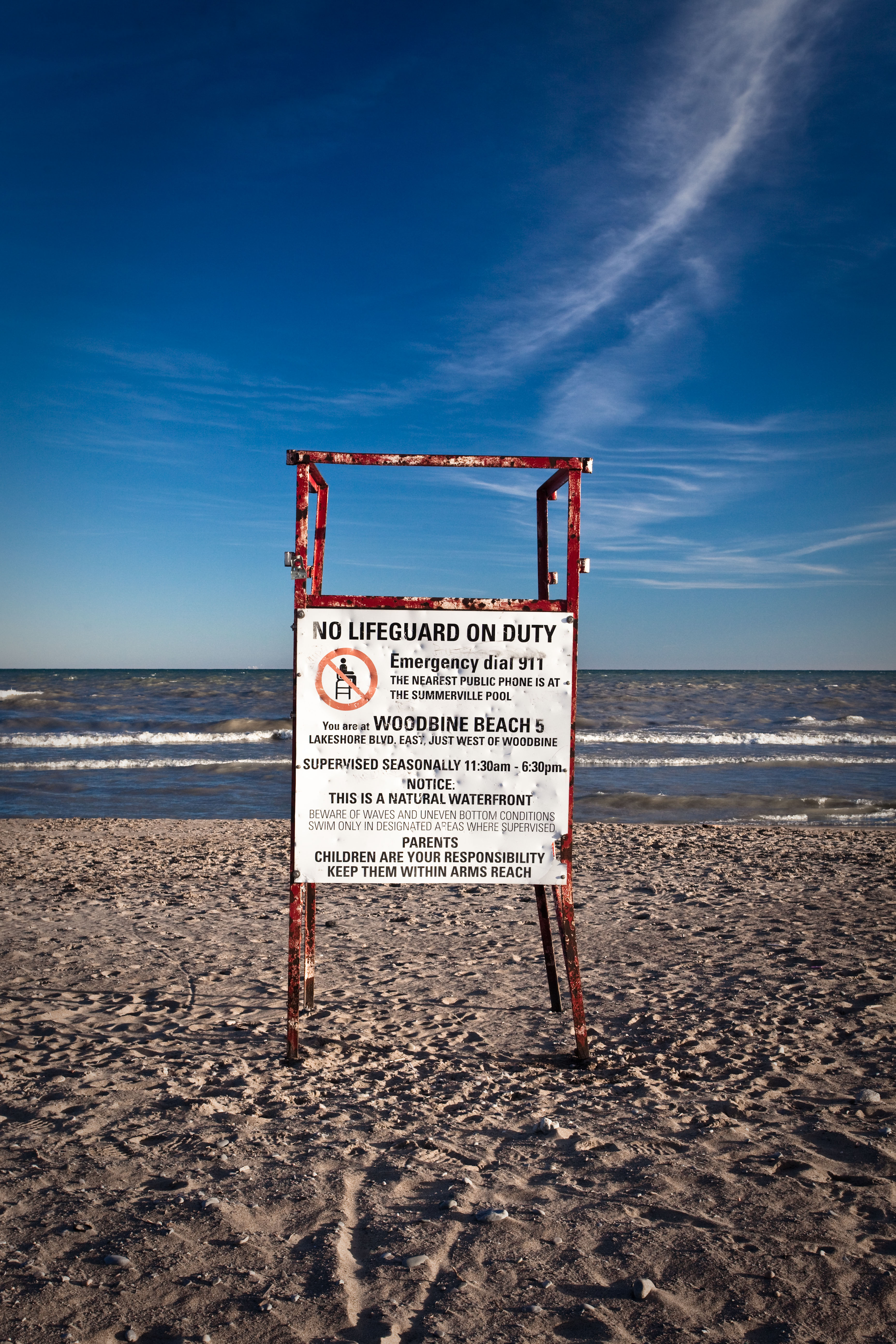
"No lifeguard on duty" sign posted in Toronto Canada

== Positioning ==
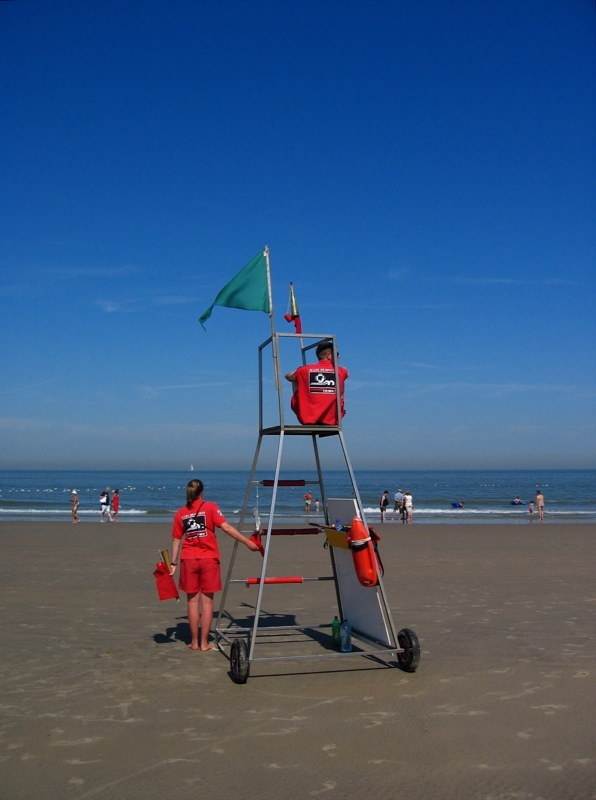
Belgian lifeguards with portable high chair to afford optimum viewing position of bathing area

Lifeguards have a primary duty to supervise their responsibility area. To achieve this the lifeguard needs an optimum position to observe the public. This is often best achieved from an elevated position, which can be a chair, platform or the roof of a vehicle. This allows them maximum visibility over their supervised area and may facilitate communication between them and their team.

Some lifeguard teams use portable platforms or chairs which can be moved to the most appropriate position. This can take account of changes such as a specific activity taking place, prevailing wind direction or simply enable lifeguards to move closer to the water if the tide goes out on a beach.

The chair or tower can also act as storage for the lifeguard, holding important rescue and communication equipment nearby. It can also act as a recognizable point for the public to find lifeguard assistance. For this reason, it is often marked with a flag or flags to enable location by the public. These flags may also give information to the bathers about current swimming conditions.

Other options, depending on the location, can include patrolling the edge of the water on foot, which allows closer interaction with the public, and the opportunity to provide face to face reassurance and advice, or supervising from within or on the water, which is most applicable in open water (such as the sea or even a large water park) where lifeguards can use boats or other personal watercraft to be in the water, which extends their range and may allow quicker response to emergencies.

=== 10/20 Protection Standard ===
The 10/20 Protection Standard is a technique developed by safety consultants Jeff Ellis and Associates, and taught to lifeguards on many courses including the United Kingdom National Pool Lifeguard Qualification.

The standard requires scanning from one side of the pool to the other, or the designated area, in 10 seconds, with the lifeguard no further than 20 seconds away from any swimmer in difficulty in the lifeguard's area.

== Flags ==
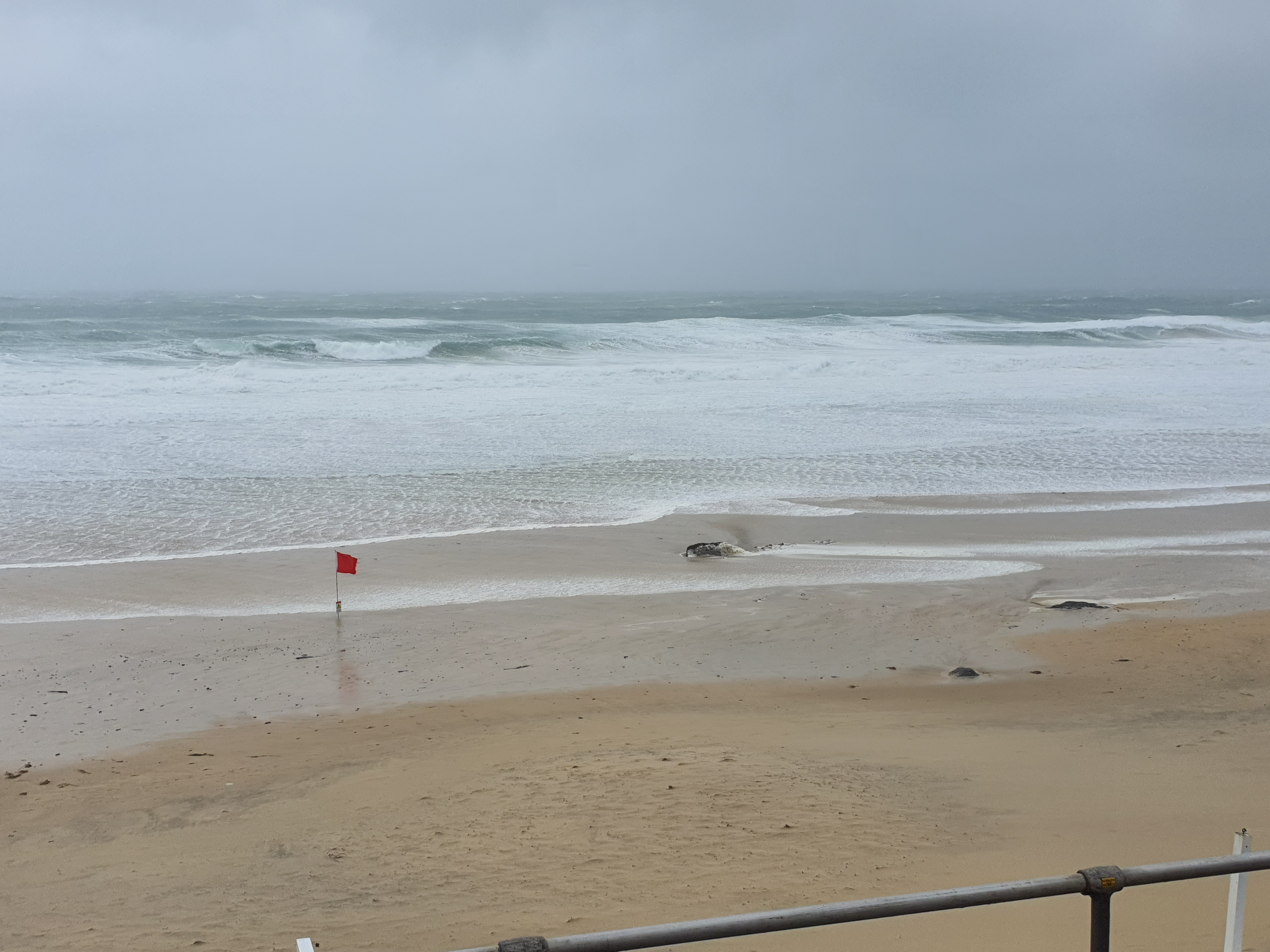
A red flag flies during heavy seas in St Ives, Cornwall. No swimming allowed.

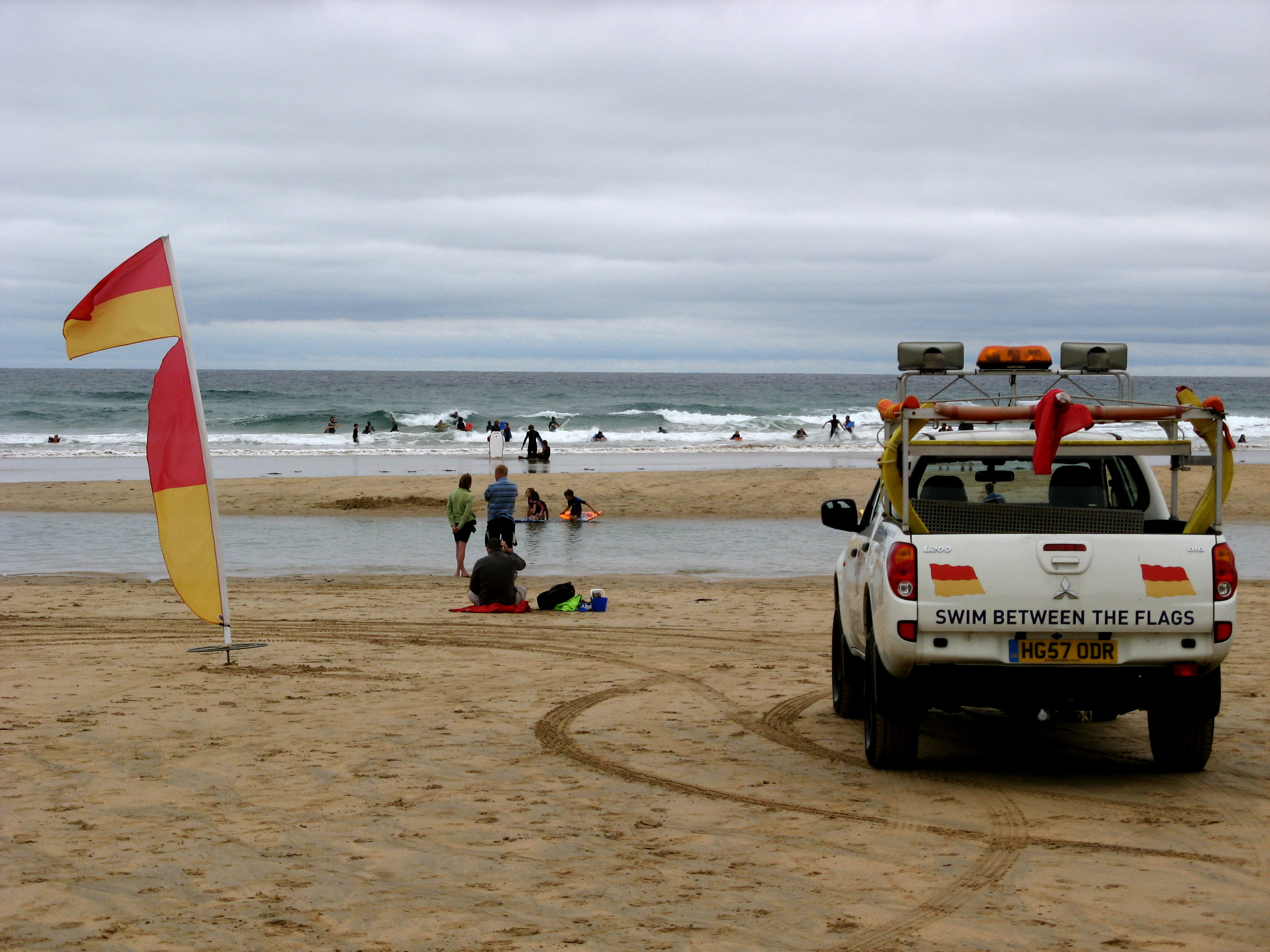
RNLI-patrol at Treyarnon Bay, Cornwall, England

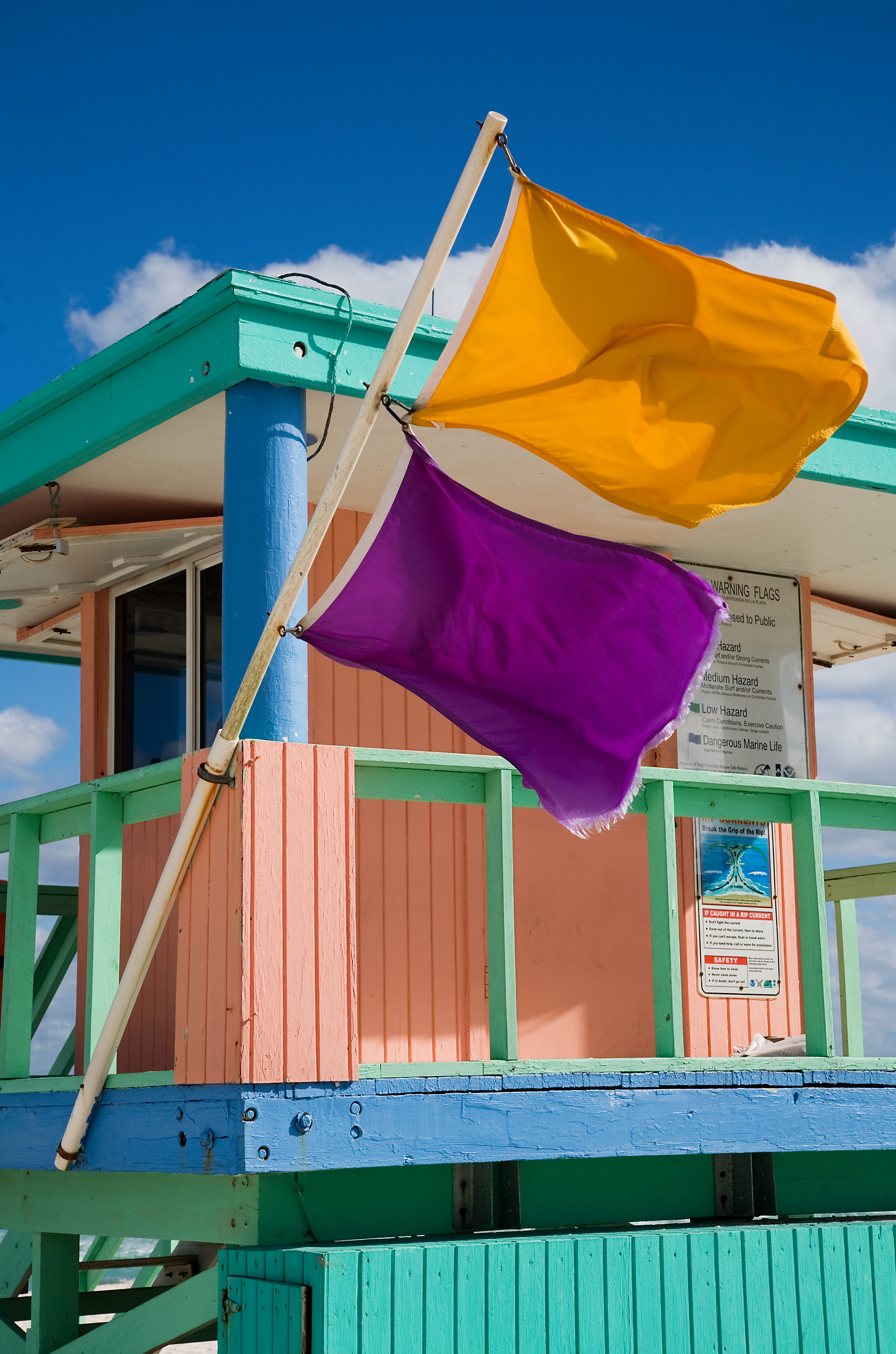
Lifeguard tower with yellow and purple flag in Miami Beach

In most countries, lifeguards use similar flag signs to signal swimmers their presence, specific areas and possible dangers:

Flag	Meaning
	Lifeguard on duty. When positioned at the shore: Marks the swimming area. (Sometimes also diagonal or as a red over yellow flag)
	High hazard. Swimming discouraged / prohibited (in some countries only at two red flags).
	Medium hazard. Only for experienced swimmers. Proceed with caution.
	Swimming is safe (usually unofficial).
	Marine pests present; mainly for jellyfish (not in all countries; in dangerous cases, the red flag is shown).
	Watercraft area. No swimming.
	Watercraft use prohibited.
	Diver in the water; sometimes also a red flag with a white diagonal stripe (see dive flag).
No flag flying	No lifeguards on duty

== Equipment ==
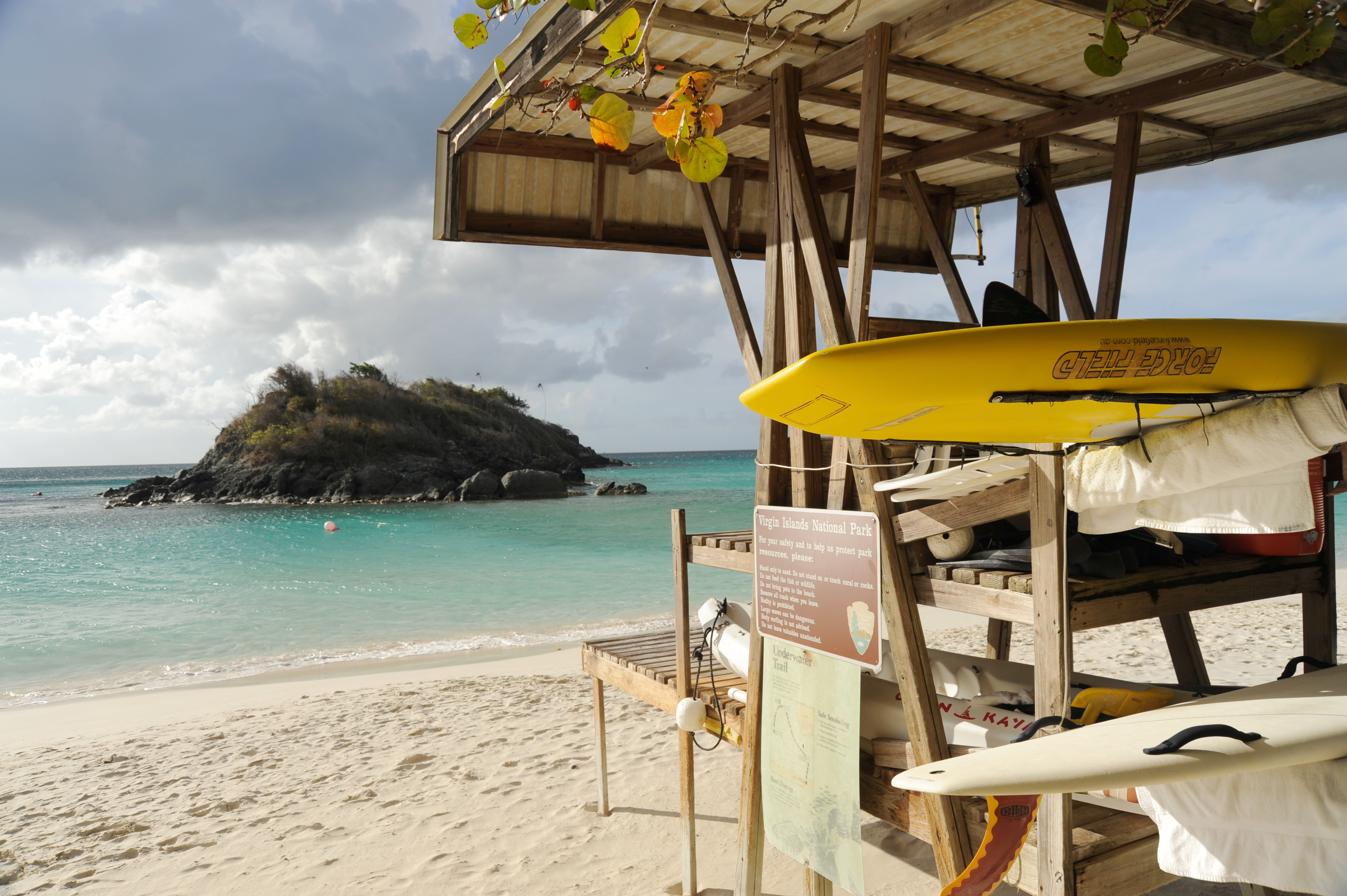
Lifeguard station at Trunk Bay on Saint John

Equipment used by lifeguards will vary depending on the location and specific conditions encountered. Certain equipment is relatively universal such as a whistle for attracting the attention of the public or other members of the team, a first aid kit and rescue aids. Other equipment includes, but is not limited to, rescue cans, rescue tubes, rescue boards, spinal boards, AEDs, trauma bags, and oxygen.

=== Rescue aids ===
E.M.I.L.Y.

There is a hierarchy of rescue techniques which minimizes danger to lifeguards and maximizes the effectiveness of a rescue, and this dictates the types of rescue aids that a lifeguard should have available. Lifeguards are supposed to have some equipment to aid rescues. After determining a swimmer is in trouble they try to help in ways that will not result in a threat to the life of the lifeguard or others. This is done by helping at a distance by using a pole; a lifebuoy may be thrown, wading to the victim, using available watercraft, swim with an aid, such as a rescue buoy. As a last resort, direct swimming to the apparent victim.

In addition to these basic lifeguarding techniques, some units are trained in additional water rescue techniques such as scuba diving and swift water training, or in rescue techniques unrelated to water rescue such as abseiling for cliff rescue and bike patrol training, and they will carry appropriate equipment for these.

=== First aid ===
Lifeguards are proficient in first aid and have a well-stocked first aid kit available. They may have advanced first aid items such as supplemental oxygen, airway management devices, a suction device, a resuscitator, a defibrillator or AED, or a spinal board. Lifeguards are trained to contact EMS personnel immediately. If a drowning victim has been rescued the victim might need EMS attention or extensive medical treatment.

California public sector lifeguards are trained in a more extensive advanced first aid that is known as Title 22 First Aid For Public Safety Personnel.

Some lifeguards are crossed trained as emergency medical technicians as a part of their emergency services system.

In certain jurisdictions, lifeguards may use airway adjuncts such as nasopharyngeal airways and oropharyngeal airways.

=== Rescue watercraft ===
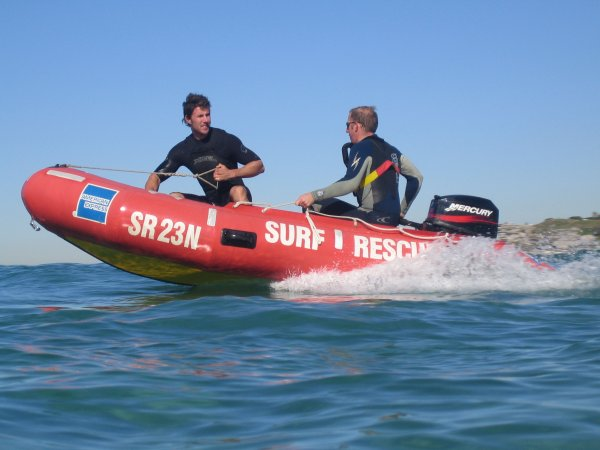
Inflatable Rescue Boat

Lifeguards will sometimes use rescue watercraft to rescue victims that are either far away or when there is large surf, i.e. big waves. Types of rescue watercraft:

- Inflatable Rescue Boats (IRBs) – These inflatable boats are useful when patrolling a beach especially ocean surf beaches where either the surf is too powerful or the beach too large to perform rescues effectively on a board.
- Row Rescue Boats – Best used in calmer water, wood paddle boats are used to patrol swimmers and for quick entry into the water when a drowning is happening at further distance. These are maneuvered and propelled by human power, so they require a lot of practice. Each boat has a larger wooden bench that allows lifeguards to perform CPR while heading back to shore, if needed.
- Rescue Water Craft (RWC) – Also known as personal watercraft, are useful for their faster top speeds and maneuverability in ocean surf conditions.

=== Communications ===
Effective communications are vital for lifeguards and they may choose to use whistles, two-way radios, megaphones or signal flares.

A more traditional method of communication with the public is through the use of colored flags, which can be raised over permanent or temporary flag poles to inform the public of different information.

More often than not a whistle is used in the pool leisure facility (public and private), the following signals are used by some lifeguards with a whistle (It is always important to remember that each facility may have their own standards and procedures for their whistle protocol).

- 1 short blast – used to gain the attention of a swimmer.
- 2 short blasts – used to gain the attention of fellow lifeguards (including managers/head lifeguards)
- 3 short blasts – used to signal that a lifeguard is activating their EAP and taking action in their area.
- 1 long blast – (swimming pools) used to clear the pool
- 1 long blast – used to signal to a fellow lifeguard that you are jumping in for an active save.
- 2 long blasts – used to signal to swimmers that they must clear the pool, this could be because the pool is closed or an emergency is taking place significant enough for the lifeguards to clear the pool.

=== Transportation ===
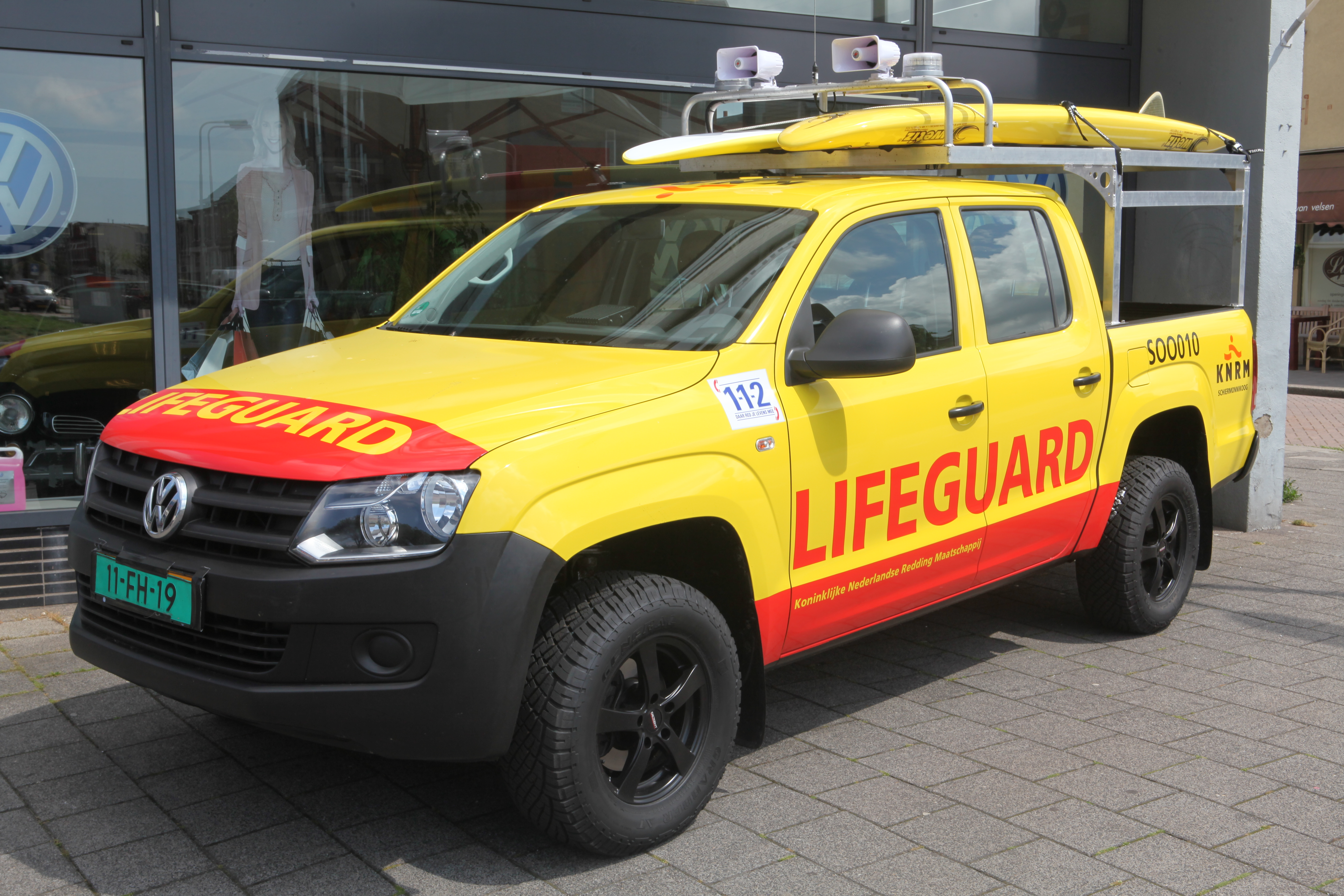
KNRM Lifeguard Schiermonnikoog Volkswagen Amarok pick-up truck

For duty areas over a wide area, such as beaches and lakes, lifeguards may require transport over distance and they may use land transport including pick-up trucks, quad bikes, gators, or other off-road vehicle.

They may also use larger water craft such as a large rigid or inflatable boats, personal water crafts, or hovercraft.

== By country ==
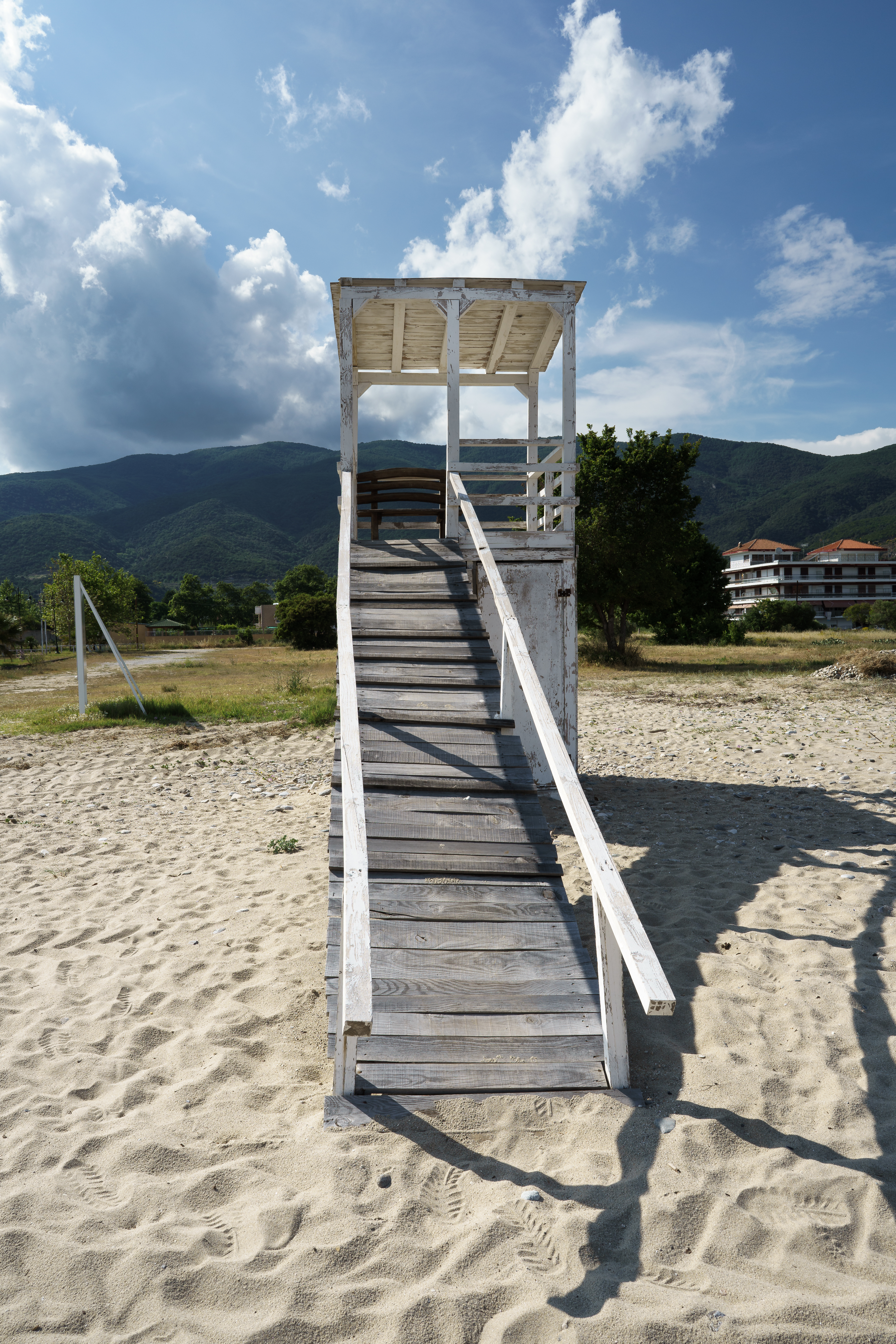
Lifeguard tower, Asprovalta (Greece)

=== Australia ===
In Australia lifeguards are distinguished from surf life savers. Lifeguards are paid employees who patrol beaches, lakes and pools/aquatic venues. Beach lifeguards are usually employed by local government authorities and patrol the beach throughout the year. Surf Lifesavers are a large voluntary organization that patrol beaches on weekends and public holidays during the warmer months (usually from mid-September to late April) and also perform public training of kids, the nippers, as well as competitions, such as surf carnivals or winter swimming events.

=== Belgium ===
Belgium has a coastline with a length of 68 kilometres (42 mi). The coast is urbanised over practically its entire length and is visited by thousands of tourists each year. In 1982 a lifeguard service has been built up to minimize the death by drowning at the Belgian coast. Because the North Sea only borders Flanders, more particularly the province of West Flanders, the training of the lifeguards is organised by that province. Beach lifeguards in Belgium are trained by the WOBRA and are mostly students who are employed for a month during the summer holidays (July and August). Some municipalities also employ lifeguards in June and September. To obtain uniformity, all municipalities from the Belgian coast joined the IKWV This is the coordinating organisation for all the municipalities for lifeguard service. The organisation of IKWV has made the Belgian coastline one of the safest coastlines of the world in a couple decades.

=== Brazil ===
In Brazil, firefighting services, accident assistance, and the rescue of people drowning on beaches, rivers, and lakes are maintained by each state's fire department. The rescue of drowning people in private places is the responsibility of the owner of the place. Like the military police, responsible for ostensive policing, the members of the fire departments are also considered military, including lifeguards. The state military police and state fire departments are auxiliary institutions and reserves of the Brazilian Army. Considering the service provided by fire departments insufficient, some Brazilian cities have their own lifeguard services, but most Brazilian lifeguards are members of fire departments.

=== Canada ===
In Canada, all lifeguards and assistant lifeguards are certified by the Lifesaving Society of Canada. The lifeguarding certification offered by the LSS is the National Lifeguard program, which was officially launched in 1964. There are four types of lifeguard certification: pool, waterpark, waterfront and surf.

As of 31 December 2022, the Canadian Red Cross Lifeguard and Learn to Swim programs were retired. Canadian Red Cross wanted to focus their efforts on humanitarian relief.

=== Denmark ===
In Denmark the lifeguard-services are divided into two major groups. The beach lifeguards, which are established on a voluntarily basis by the beach administrators (in most cases the municipality). There are three main lifeguard service providers, one heavily sponsored: TrygFonden Kystlivredning, which is backed by TrygFonden (Danish Foundation) while Den Nordsjællandske Kystlivredningstjeneste are sponsored by the councils at the Zealand Northshore. In Copenhagen there is Team Bade lifeguard service, run by Copenhagen Municipality. All public pools (both commercial and government) are required to "provide a secure and safe environment" and thus lifeguards. Unlike the beach lifeguards, these have to pass a government approved test as well as a yearly a physical examination and first aid test.

=== Germany ===
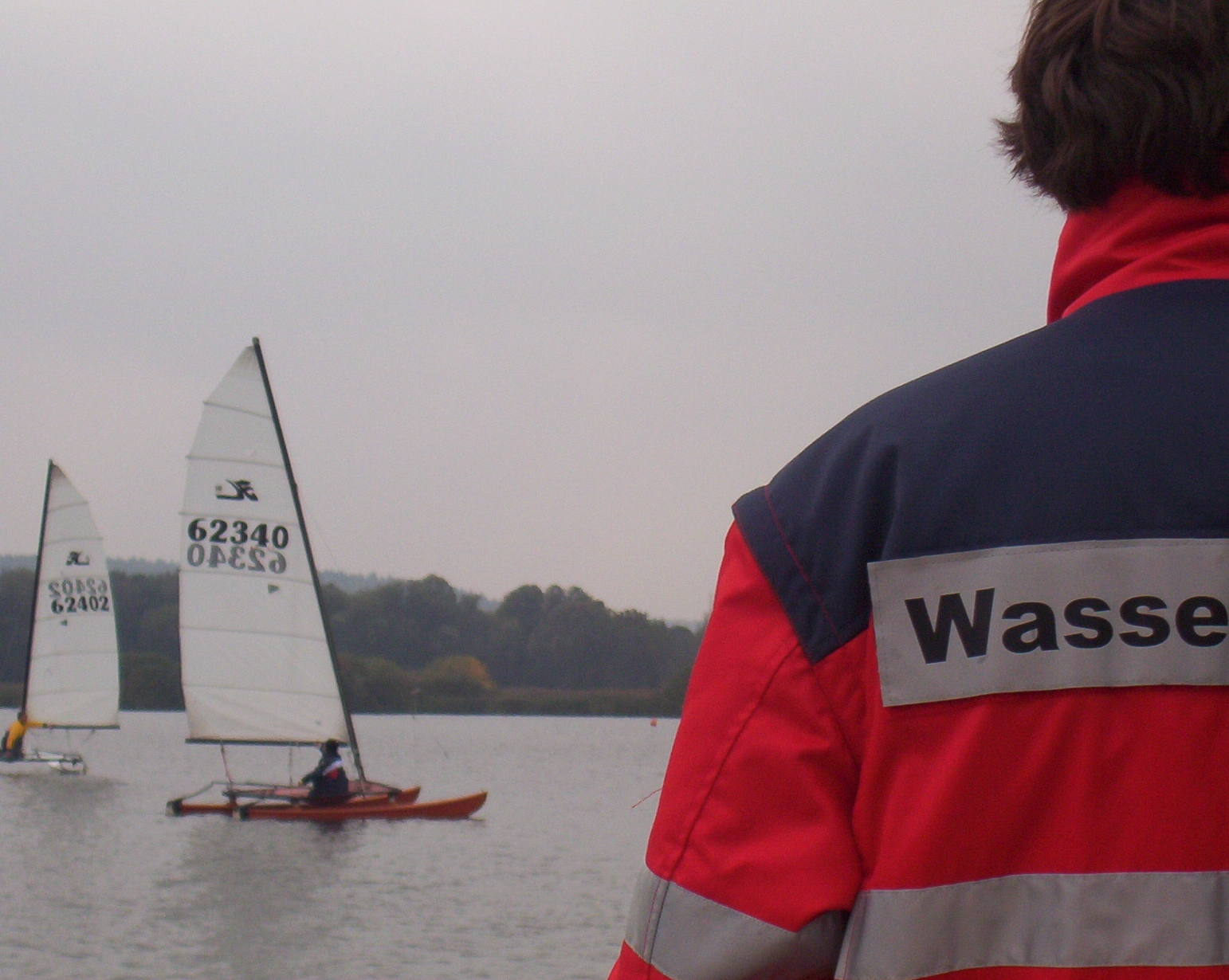
A member of the Wasserwacht observing a regatta

In Germany three major organizations exist that train people in swimming, lifesaving and which maintain lifeguard services at public beaches, lakes etc. All three are mainly based on volunteer work. The DLRG (Deutsche Lebens-Rettungs-Gesellschaft – German Life Saving Society) is the largest aquatic lifeguard organization in the world with more than 1,000,000 members and promoters. The Wasserwacht (water watch) is a division of the German Red Cross. Third is the Wasserrettungsdienst of the Arbeiter-Samariter-Bund Deutschland. Also the Fire Departments will maintain lifeguard services at rivers, coasts and lakes. In Germany, anyone who wants to be a ILS Pool Lifeguard equivalent requires the following certification: 'Rettungsschwimmer Silber' (DRSA Silber) In order to attain this, they have to demonstrate various practical and theoretical skills, e.g. 25m distance diving, three deep dives to 3-5m depth retrieving 5kg brick, 300m swimming in clothing in 12 minutes, rescue exercises, and various other skills. The training is considered more demanding than in many other countries.

=== India ===
In India the longest coast overseen by lifeguards is Goa's 105 km shoreline. Drishti Marine holds government contracts with a body of 710 professionally trained lifeguards across Goa and Mumbai. They have 5000+ rescues on record since starting operations in 2008. The lifeguards are trained by Special Rescue Training Academy (SRTA) and enlisted as government first response for emergency services such as flood rescue. The lifeguards in Goa are also trained in stranded marine mammal rescue as part of Ocean Watch a collaborative effort between Drishti Marine, Terra Conscious, Goa Forest Department and IUCN India. They conduct regular interventions for turtles and dolphins caught in ghost nets.

In October 2018 Drishti lifeguards were water safety partners for India's first Ironman held in Miramar Goa.

=== Iran ===
In Iran, the lifesaving organization is the "Iran lifesaving organization." It has an areas roughly equal to that of the United Kingdom, France, Spain, and Germany combined, or somewhat more than the US state of Alaska. Iran has a coastline to the Caspian Sea to the north, and the Persian Gulf and the Gulf of Oman to the south.

=== Ireland ===
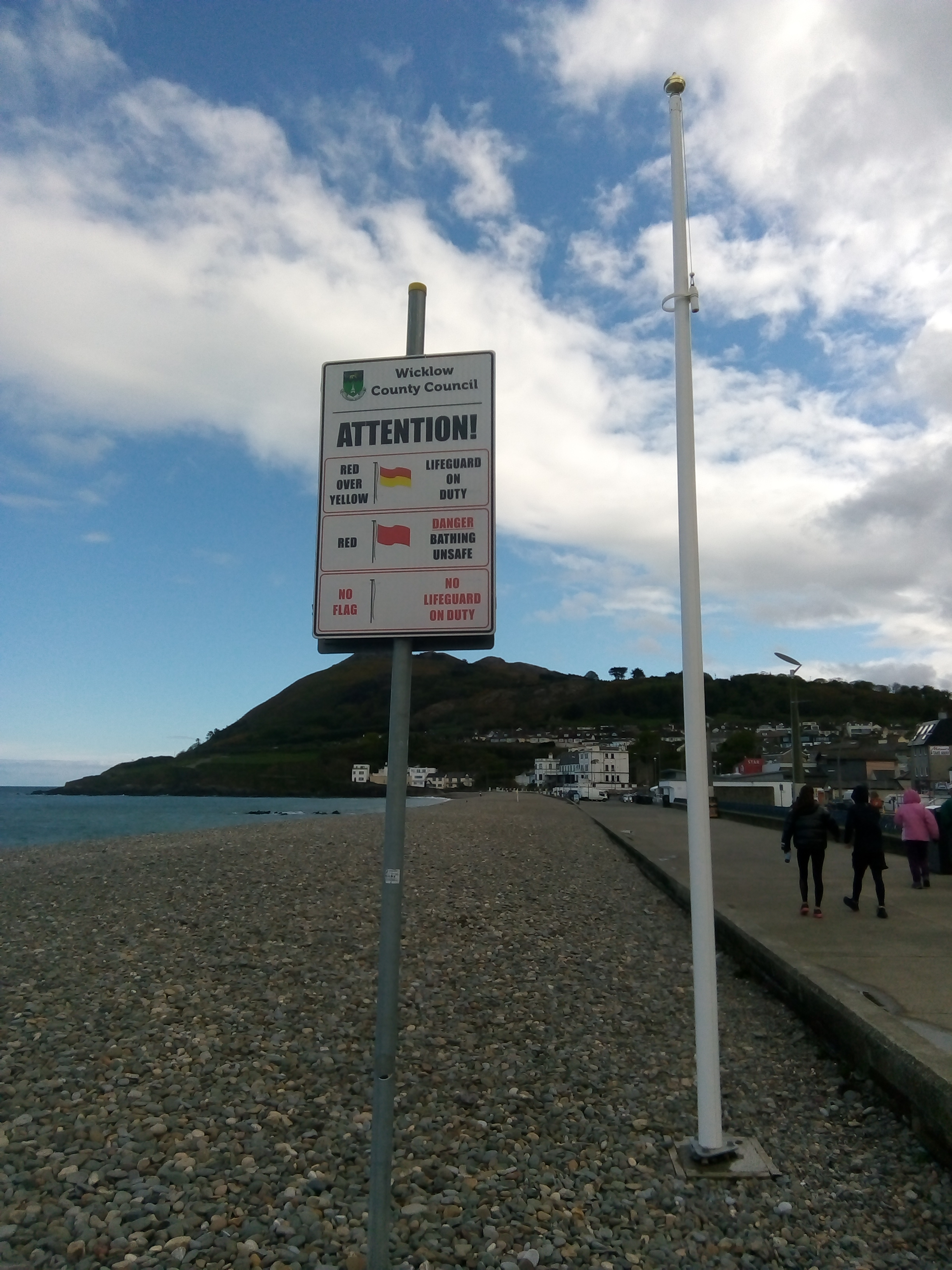
Sign in Bray, Ireland explaining lifeguard flags

In Ireland, the statutory body established to promote water safety is "Irish Water Safety" who train and award lifeguards with the National Pool Lifeguard Award, the National Beach Lifeguard Award and the Inland Open Water Lifeguard Award.

In addition in Ireland the Royal Lifesaving Society (RLSS), through independent trainer assessors / clubs, trains and qualifies lifeguards with the National Pool Lifeguard Qualification (NPLQ) and the National Beach Lifeguard Qualification (NBLQ).

=== Italy ===
In Italy, Lifeguards are certified by the Italian Swimming Federation the National Lifesaving Society and the Italian Water Rescue Federation. The Italian Swimming Federation's diploma is recognized abroad by the country affiliated to ILS whilst the National Lifesaving Society is active member and internationally recognized by the International Maritime Rescue Federation. Differences exist between pool, lakes and sea diplomas. Also Italian Red Cross has a special branch called OPSA (Polyvalent Water Rescue Operators) that has some lifeguards duties in some parts of Italy. Lifeguards in Italy are not organised in a unique service: every venue has its own Lifeguards, depending on licenses, danger and requests. Public beaches are not patrolled by an organisation, but each comune calls on duty freelance lifeguards during summer or particular events, when public funds can afford the costs. In some beaches, where there hotels or other structures have licenses, there is the obligation to have lifeguards, that are paid by the structure itself.

=== New Zealand ===
In New Zealand the term lifeguard generally refers to swimming pool lifeguards but can be used interchangeably with lifesaver. These are qualified paid professionals employed by the pool management to watch over pool users. Surf Life Saving New Zealand (SLSNZ) is responsible for training and maintaining coastal Surf Lifesaving in New Zealand. Surf Lifesavers patrol various beaches in New Zealand. Lifesavers are able to sit their Bronze Medallion which qualifies them as a volunteer Surf Lifeguards. Volunteers patrol New Zealand's beaches on weekends over the summer months from Labour Day to around Easter. Paid Lifeguards patrol beaches during the week over the busiest summer months. They also come under the control of SLSNZ.

=== Netherlands ===
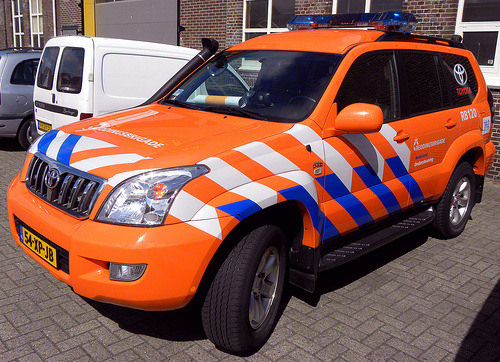
Dutch lifeguard truck

The KNBRD or Reddingsbrigade is the Dutch lifeguard association. The Netherlands has more than 200 units on the Dutch beaches, and over 5000 active volunteers. The lifeguards secure the Dutch coastline and also many cities that have a lot of swimming water, like lakes. They also provide training. The KNBRD wears the international clothing style which is yellow/red. The KNBRD works together with the KNRM. Additionally, many local rescue teams have one or more disaster units which can be called in case of major flooding anywhere in the country.

=== Portugal ===
In Portugal, the lifeguard service is coordinated by the Portuguese Lifeguard Institute (ISN). Under the technical tutelage of the ISN, several organizations provide lifeguard services in the Portuguese maritime and river beaches. The entities that have a concession to explore a beach are obliged to contract a lifeguard service to be provided in the respective concession area. In the cases of beaches that are not under concession, the contracting and providing of lifeguard services is usually done by the local municipalities. The ISN is responsible for the establishment of standards for the training, equipment and uniforms of the lifeguards.

=== Singapore ===
In Singapore the lifesaving organization is the Singapore Lifesaving Society(SLSS) which is responsible for administering lifesaving awards. Lifeguards have to earn their Lifesaving 1, 2 and 3 awards before they are allowed to move on to Bronze Medallion which is the minimum requirement for employment in most Singapore pools.

=== Spain ===
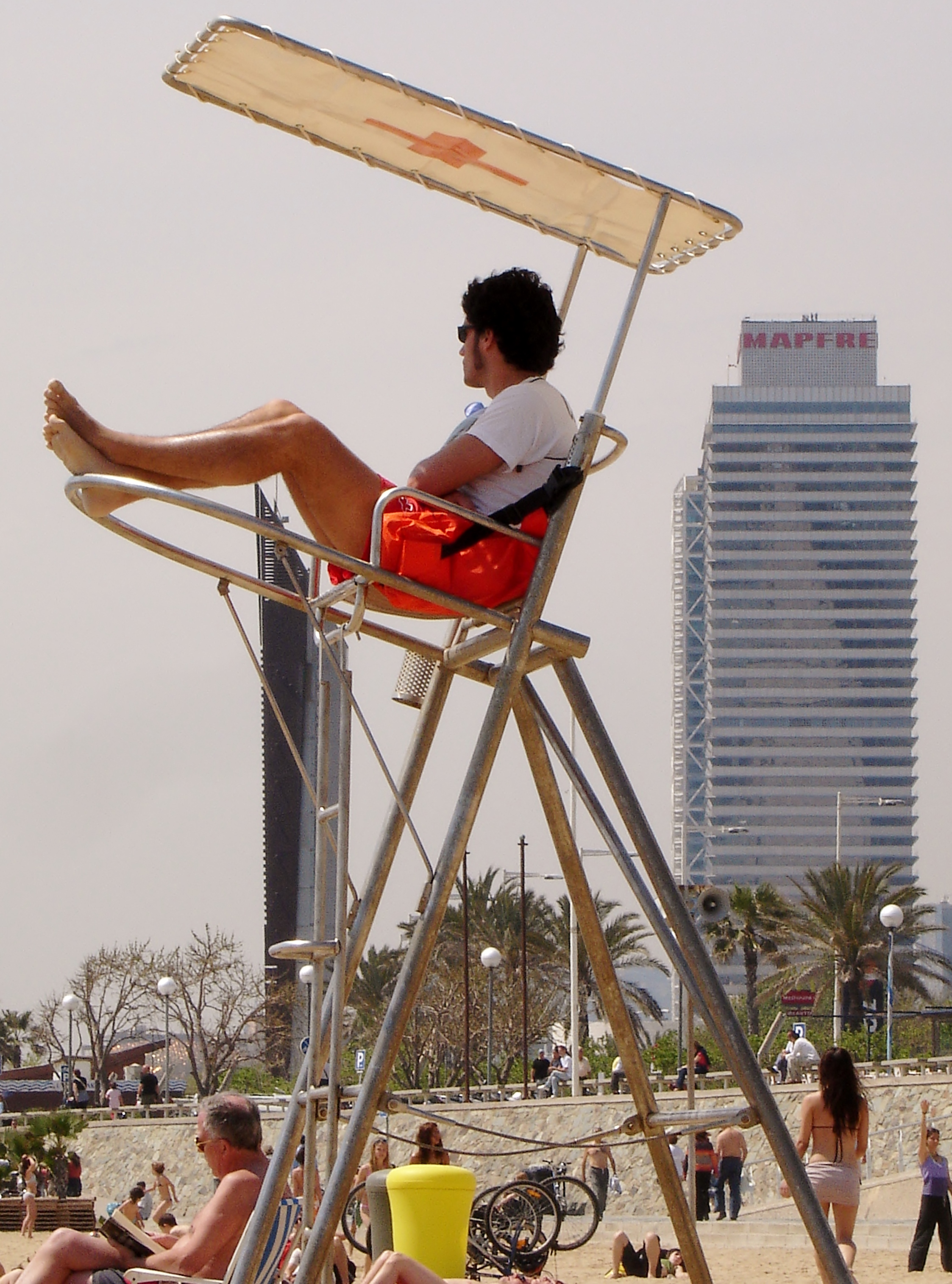
Lifeguard in Barcelona

In Spain there are many organizations that teach and train people in lifesaving. The International Lifeguard Society and Royal Spanish Rescue and Lifesaving Federation are a couple of the prominent organizations.

=== Switzerland ===
In Switzerland the lifesaving organization is the Swiss Lifesaving Society.

=== South Africa ===
Lifeguards in South Africa are certified through Lifesaving South Africa, a regulatory body. All Lifesaving Award (LA) trainees are thoroughly trained in surf rescue with pool and open water training being incorporated into the LA course. Once a year, Lifesaving SA holds an annual retest for all LA certified Lifeguards. If this retest is not completed or is failed three years consecutively the LA certification lapses. In the event of the LA certification lapsing the lifeguard will have to redo the LA course in its entirety.

Common equipment used by lifeguards in rescue situations are: Rigid torpedo buoys, soft torpedo buoys, rescue craft (malibu boards), paddle skis, box line, throw line and spinal boards. Common equipment used by Lifeguards in first aid situations are: Saline solution, bandages, antiseptics, antihistamines, oxygen kits, latex gloves, laerdal pocket masks, splints, rescue blankets and first aid kits.

Beaches in South Africa are contracted out to independent or private companies. These companies submit tenders, on an annual basis, to local municipalities/government. Lifeguards who are not permanently employed by a company often find work during the holiday periods as Temp Lifeguards on main beaches. Often students who hold LA certification will work on a day by day basis during busy seasons.

Many main beaches such as Scottburgh and St Michaels beaches have voluntary lifeguard clubs. These clubs recruit new members into the Lifeguard niche by way of their nipper and Junior Lifesaving Award programs. A cost-effective way of obtaining the LA certification would be to join a club and do the course, at a reduced rate, through that club.

=== Taiwan ===
In Taiwan there are three main lifesaving organizations providing lifeguard licenses and training, one is called National Water Life Saving Association Republic of China (NWLSAROC) another is called The Red Cross Society of the Republic of China and National Chinese Surf Life Saving Association(NCSLSA). NWLSA was first launched in 1970 and aided by Australians Surf Life Savers. The Red Cross Society was founded around 1949. NWLSA joined the International Life Saving Federation in 1994. National Chinese Surf Lifesaving Association, founded in 1993 and joined ILS as associated member in 1997, is the first and only organization that focus on training surf lifesaver and open-water lifeguard in Taiwan.

=== United Kingdom ===
==== Pool lifeguards ====
In the United Kingdom, there are three awarding bodies for Lifeguard qualifications, Highfield Awarding Body for Compliance (HABC), the Swimming Teachers Association, and the Royal Life Saving Society UK (RLSS). The organisations' qualifications are STA Level 2 Award for Pool Lifeguard / STA Professional Award for Pool Lifeguard (title in Scotland,) the HABC Level 2 Award in Pool lifeguarding (QCF) and the National Pool Lifeguard Qualification respectively. The National Pool Lifeguard Qualification is administered by the Institute of Qualified Lifeguards (IQL) on behalf of the RLSS.

All three qualifications are recognised professionally within the United Kingdom and enable the holder to work as a Professional Pool Lifeguard satisfying all Health and Safety Executive (HSE) regulations. For Public Swimming sessions a full lifeguard qualification is recommended by the HSE in the Managing health and safety in swimming pools manual.

A full Pool Lifeguard course lasts a minimum of 36 hours and ends with external examiners testing the individuals both on land and in the water and includes an examination paper (verbal in Generation 8 NPLQ, however this has been replaced with multiple choice questions in the new Generation 9, consisting of three sections; first aid, lifeguarding situations and pool specifics). The qualification is valid for two years from the date of assessment. A minimum of 20 hours training must be logged in those two years for the individual to be eligible to submit for a renewal examination. The employer of the lifeguard should provide training every month in lifeguard skills and resuscitation training to help it comply with HSE guidelines. Additional units which all full Pool Lifeguards are assessed vigorously and which all Leisure facilities must have (public and private) is the use of spinal boards, a specialist piece of rescue equipment designed for immobilizing a casualty suspected of suffering a spinal cord injury. They are trained in lifeguarding, first aid and CPR and are typically stationed at beaches, pools, or other bodies of water where there is a risk of drowning.

HABC/RLSS qualifications are trained by TAs (Trainer/Assessors) and STA qualifications are trained by tutors. These are experienced lifeguards or lifesavers who have undergone additional training to train and assess. Many leisure centres have their own TAs or tutors who operate in-house training for the lifeguards. TAs and tutors also assess qualification renewals but RLSS TAs and STA tutors are unable to assess any lifeguard who works in the same place the TA or tutors hold training sessions. Also they are unable to assess any lifeguard they have trained. Highfield (HABC) T/As are able to assess lifeguards from the same centre as long as they have had no involvement with the training.

In 2012, there were no reported drownings in UK swimming pools where there was a lifeguard on duty.

==== Beach lifeguards ====
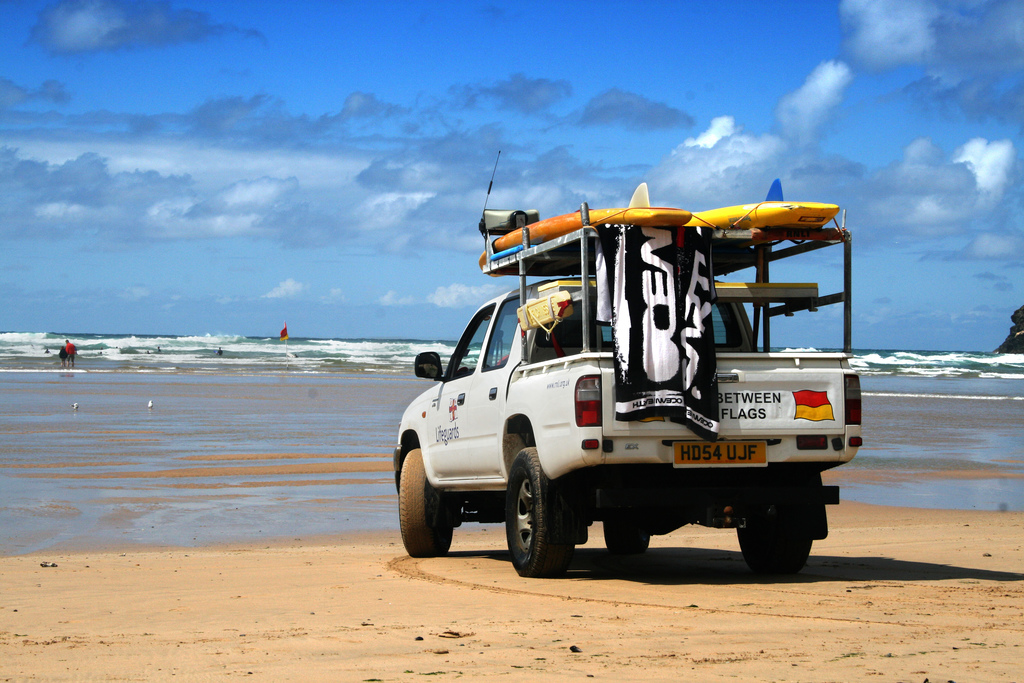
Lifeguard pick-up truck of the RNLI

The three alternative schemes for qualifying beach lifeguard in the UK are run by the Royal Life Saving Society UK, who offer the 'National Vocational Beach Lifeguard Qualification' (NVBLQ), Surf Life Saving Wales and Surf Life Saving Great Britain (in association with the Royal National Lifeboat Institution) who offer the 'National Rescue Standards Beach Lifeguard Qualification' (NaRS BL).

Both organizations also offer a range of "specialist modules" that can be added to the basic qualification, such as VHF Radio Operator; Rescue Water Craft RWC, Rescue Surf Skills, Rescue (paddle) Board, Rescue Boat (Crew), Rescue Boat (Driver), AED and CPR Oxygen Administration.

The RNLI is the largest operator of lifeguard units in the UK, patrolling over 230 operational beaches around the coast of England and Wales, helping around 7,000 people each year.

RNLI lifeguards at Widemouth bay, Cornwall

==== Canoe lifeguards ====
The British Canoe Union has canoe life guard units in the UK managed by the BCU Lifeguards. These are special units that operate in Kayaks and Canoes in areas where motor boats would have problems.

==== Inland lifeguards ====
Inland water sites such as lakes, rivers and estuaries – typically where there is a specific need, such as sports competitions or public events. There are a few examples of organisations that provide such services; some operating on a voluntary basis such as Colwick Park Lifeguards, relying heavily on the services of volunteers. There are also commercial entities that provide similar services, ranging from marina staff to workboat providers. Typically in the UK voluntary groups of this type are either local to that particular stretch of water or provide a service across the country. As of recently, the Royal Life Saving Society has offered an Open Water Lifeguard qualification which specialises in still, non-tidal waters. This acts as an entirely separate qualification or can be done as an additional module in National Pool Lifeguard Qualifications (NPLQs).

==== Northern Ireland ====
In Northern Ireland, the Royal Life Saving Society (RLSS IRELAND) also provide training in lifesaving and courses in lifeguarding for both the National Pool Lifeguard Qualification (NPLQ) and the National Beach Lifeguard Qualification.

=== United States ===
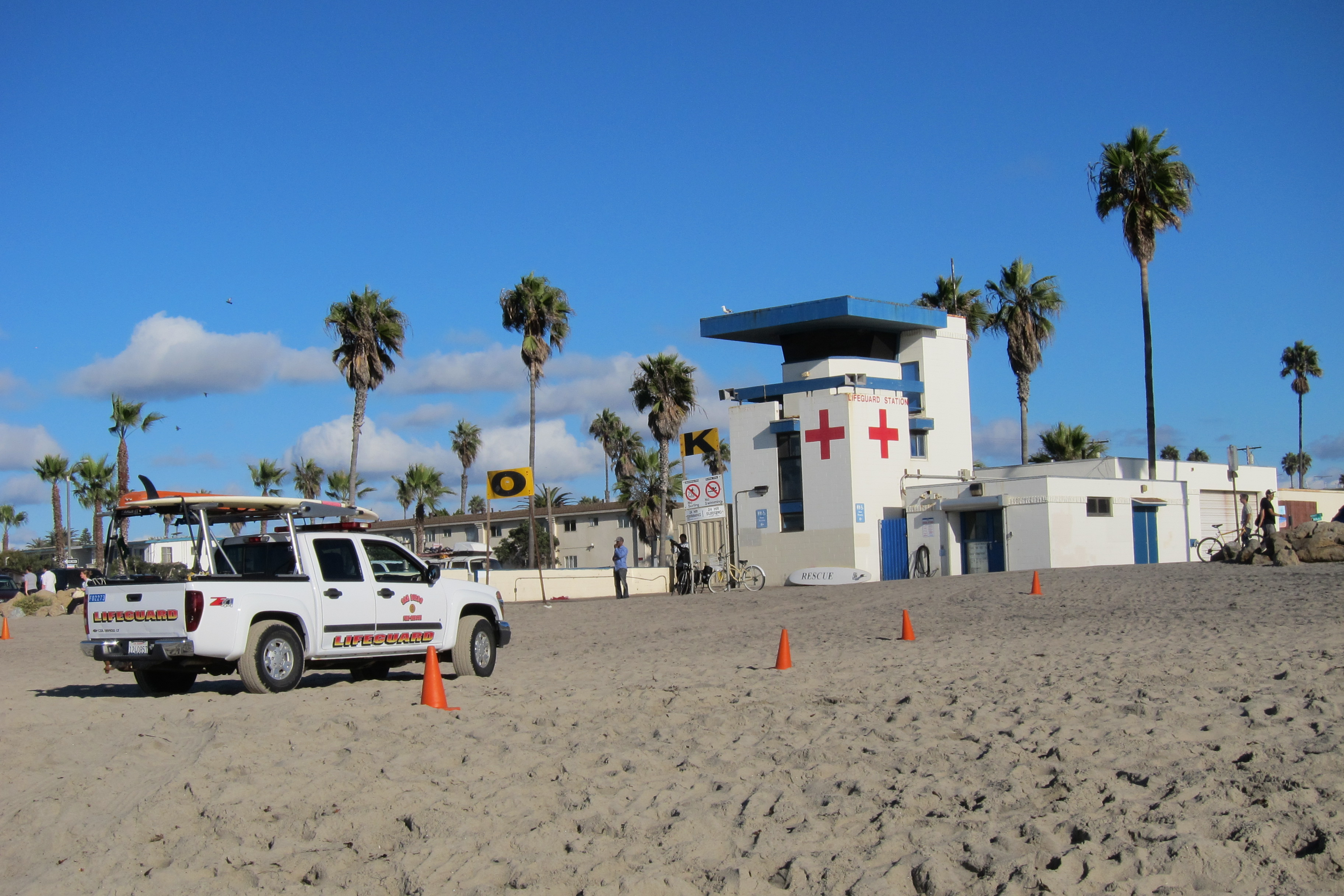
Lifeguard tower and truck in Ocean Beach, San Diego, California

In the United States there are several nationally recognized organizations that certify lifeguards. The American Red Cross, American Lifeguard And Safety Training, Jeff Ellis and Associates, the YMCA, Starfish Aquatics Institute's Starguard program, NASCO, and the Boy Scouts of America. The standard in open water surf training is the United States Lifesaving Association.

The American Red Cross, American Lifeguard And Safety Training, Boy Scouts of America, YMCA, USLA and Ellis and Associates establish standards which are universally adopted for lifeguard training.

The first beach patrol in the United States was founded in 1891 in Atlantic City, New Jersey. The Atlantic City Beach Patrol is currently the oldest active beach patrol in the United States.

In 2009, 117 drowned at the nation's beaches; 21 drowned where lifeguards were on duty. There were 82,969 rescues reported from 114 reporting agencies.

== Consent ==
In an active emergency, lifeguards are required to act, and to ask permission to give care in any situation. Ill or injured people can grant their informed consent for care. Someone who is unresponsive, confused or seriously injured or ill (such as in a nonfatal drowning) may not be able to grant consent. In these cases, the law assumes the victim would give consent if able. This is called implied consent, and also applies to an underage victim whose parent or guardian is not present.

== Competition ==
Continuous training is necessary to maintain lifeguarding skills and knowledge. Formal competitions have developed as a way to encourage training, and also as a social activity. In Australia, the annual Surf Lifesaving competition at Kurrawa Beach on the Gold Coast is the largest athletic event in the world after the Olympic Games with tens of thousands of lifeguards competing. Lifeguard competitions include both physical events and technical (medical) events. Technical events are challenging accident simulations in which guards are evaluated on their adherence to treatment standards. These events are a subject of controversy amongst some lifeguards due to their subjectivity. Purely physical competitions have recently become more popular, often including various combinations of running, swimming, paddle boarding, and surf skiing. Most lifeguard competitions include an Ironman event that combines three different physical activities.

- Australian Surf Life Saving Championships, Perth Australia
- Risser's Beach, Nova Scotia
- Bournemouth Lifeguards Corps Regatta, UK
- Nova Scotia Surf League
- British Universities Lifesaving Clubs Association League
- Federacion Aragonesa de Salvamento y Socorrismo

== See also ==
- Beach
- Coast guard
- Drowning
- Dolphin dive
- Rip current
- First aid
- Lifesaving
- Rescue
- Rescue swimmer
- Swimming pool
- Cardiopulmonary resuscitation
