= Drowning chain =

Series of conditions that can lead to drowning

The drowning chain is a series of conditions that on their own, or together can lead to a person being drowned. Each link in the chain can lead on to another link, or directly to a fatal or non-fatal drowning. The chain is used by lifeguards as a basis for targeting their activity at preventing, rather than reacting to, drowning or other incidents.

The conditions that allow drowning to occur can be summarised by the 'drowning chain', in which each link can lead directly to an incident, or can lead on to the next link, and is shown below. It consists of people having a lack of education (e.g. about water safety or local conditions), a lack of safety advice (e.g. about rip currents at a beach) a lack of protection (e.g. such as no flotation device for a weak swimmer), lack of safety supervision (e.g. from a family member or lifeguard) or an inability to cope (e.g. strong surf with a weak swimmer).

The drowning chain provides a clear basis for preventing drowning which includes:

- Education and information
- Provision of warnings
- Denial of access
- Supervision
- Training in survival skills

Some organisations use a variation on the above model which follows:

1. Ignorance, disregard or misjudgment of danger
2. Uninformed or unrestricted access to the hazard
3. Lack of supervision or surveillance
4. Inability to cope

This alternate model follows the same key points, with slightly more emphasis on personal responsibility.
