= Dolphin dive =

Diving technique used by lifeguards

In non-competitive diving, a dolphin dive is a form of rapid entry used by lifeguards to quickly traverse stretches of shallow (waist – chest deep) water. To perform a dolphin dive:

- The rescuer runs to a point where the water is roughly-waist deep.
- Before forward momentum can be slowed, the rescuer leaps forward in a dive position, arching his body to break the surface and reach down towards the ground.
- The rescuer then tucks his feet underneath his chest to where his hands were, and begins the next dive.

Dolphin dives are performed in rapid succession until the water is neck-deep, at which point the rescuer transitions into an appropriate swimming stroke, such as heads-up front crawl or breaststroke.
