= Iron Series =

Australian ironman racing series

The Iron Series (known as the Shaw and Partners Iron Series under naming rights) is a professional iron man and iron women racing series operated by Surf Life Saving Australia. It is best known for its time as the Kellogg's Nutri-Grain Ironman Series; the cereal company sponsored the event for almost 40 years.

The series has over the years taken place over various locations, including: Smiths Beach in the Margaret River region of South West Western Australia; Newcastle Beach in Newcastle, New South Wales; North Cronulla Beach in Cronulla, New South Wales; Coolum Beach on the Sunshine Coast of Queensland; and Surfers Paradise on the Gold Coast of Queensland.

== History ==
Professional ironman racing was born out of the movie The Coolangatta Gold which featured multiple Australian Ironman champion Grant Kenny and was won by Guy Leech. With significant media attention beginning to grow, Surf Life Saving Australia established the ‘Kellogg’s Nutri-Grain Grand Prix’ in 1986. The aim of the series was to generate a high public profile and showcase for the sport, the athletes and the surf life saving movement.

== Formats ==
The Iron Series is contested over a various race formats which help to create an even playing field for the competitors.

=== Loop Format ===
Description: A continuous race over a conventional Ironman course, swim, board, ski and run. Each 'Loop' consists of one lap of each discipline. A race may consist of three Loops for men and two loops for women, depending on conditions and the course. The order of the disciplines in the race will vary depending on the event.

=== M-Shape ===
Description: A continuous race over a modified course, where the competitors round 3 markers, two beyond the swell, and one on the beach. A race may consist of three loops for men and two for women, depending on conditions and the course.

=== Triple Sprint Pursuit ===
Description: Two conventional Ironman races with the combined points totals to determine handicap starting positions in a third race. The result of the third race determines the round placings. Introduced in Round 1 of the 2015/16 series at Coolum Beach.

=== Endurosurf ===
Endurosurf is a 40-minute Iron race over an M-Shaped or traditional course. Each of the disciplines of swim, board, ski will be completed two or three times, with competitors taking on the surf break again and again.

=== Super Sprint ===
The Super Sprint involves three separate, 10-minute races with 5-minutes rest between each race. Equal points are allocated for races 1 and 2 with double points being awarded for the final race.

=== The Specialist ===
The Specialist is four separate races, one for each discipline of swim, board, ski and run. There will be a 5-minute countdown between each race. At the conclusion of the four separate races, the final race will be conducted with a staggered start commencing from the finish arch. The athlete ranked 1st after the four Specialist races will start on ‘GO,’ with the remaining athletes then starting 2-seconds apart in sequential order in accordance to their ranking.

=== Eliminator ===
The Eliminator event, also known as the "Survival" event, involves three separate, 10-12 minute long Iron races where the last five to six finishers of each race are eliminated, leaving six to eight competitors to start the final race.

=== WaveCross ===
WaveCross is a 12-minute traditional iron-man race is held. The fastest 16 competitors qualify for the quarter-final stage.

The quarter-finals feature four groups of four competitors each, the discipline order is swim-board-ski, and the top two from each group qualify for the semi-finals.

The semi-finals feature two groups of four competitors each, the discipline order is board-ski-swim, and the top two from each group qualify for the final.

The final features four competitors, and the discipline order is ski-swim-board.

The format is based on the traditional course however single buoys may be utilised.

In the event that the WaveCross format cannot be run due to weather or surf conditions, SLSA will advise of an alternative format.

== Points ==
Since the 2011/12 series, the following points awarded for each competitor per round were as follows:

	2011/12	2012/13	2013/14	2014/15	2015/16	2017	2017/18	2018/19	2019/20 to 2021/22
1st	20		20	20	23	100	100	100	20
2nd	17		17	17	20	98	88	88	19
3rd	15		15	15	18	96	78	78	18
4th	13		13	13	16	94	70	70	17
5th	12		12	12	15	92	64	64	16
6th	11		11	11	14	90	60	60	15
7th	10		10	10	13	88	57	57	14
8th	9		9	9	12	86	55	55	13
9th	8		8	8	11	84	54	53	12
10th	7		7	7	10	82	53	51	11
11th	6		6	6	9	81	52	49	10
12th	5		5	5	8	80	51	47	9
13th	4		4	4	7	79	50	45	8
14th	3		3	3	6	78	49	43	7
15th	2		2	2	5	77	48	41	6
16th	1		1	-	4	76	47	39	5
17th	-		-	-	3	75	46	37	4
18th	-	-	-	-	2	74	45	35	3
19th	-	-	-	-	-	73	44	33	2
20th	-	-	-	-	-	72	43	31	1

== Women's series results (top five) ==
Season	Competitors	Winner	Second	Third	Fourth	Fifth
1990/91		Samantha O’Brien				
1991/92		Karla Gilbert				
1992/93						
1993/94						
1994/95						
1995/96						
1996/97		Stacey Gartrell				
1997/98	Nil	Not Conducted				
1998/99		Denby Stokes				
1999/00		Denby Stokes/Kristy Munroe				
2000/01		Karla Gilbert				
2001/02		Karla Gilbert				
2002/03		Karla Gilbert	Penny Turner	Kristyl Smith		
2003/04		Kristy Cameron	Kristyl Smith	Hayley Bateup	Naomi Flood	Lee Vrolyks
2004/05		Kristy Cameron	Kristyl Smith	Chelsea Mackenzie		
2005/06		Kristy Cameron	Kristy Munroe	Emma Wynne		
2006/07		Kristy Harris (née Cameron)	Liz Pluimers	Kristyl Smith	Alicia Marriott	Allira Richardson
2007/08		Liz Pluimers				
2008/09		Naomi Flood	Kristyl Smith	Liz Pluimers	Courtney Hancock	
2009/10	23	Alicia Marriott	Liz Pluimers	Naomi Flood	Kristyl Smith, Hayley Bateup (tied)	
2010/11	21	Courtney Hancock	Liz Pluimers	Alicia Marriot	Kristyl Smith	Gemma Newbiggin
2011/12	21	Liz Pluimers	Kristyl Smith	Courtney Hancock	Jordan Mercer	Brodie Moir
2012/13	17	Courtney Hancock	Naomi Flood	Brodie Moir	Jordan Mercer	Rebecca Creedy
2013/14	16	Courtney Hancock	Liz Pluimers	Kristyl Smith	Maddy Dunn	Rebecca Creedy
2014/15	15	Liz Pluimers	Rebecca Creedy	Harriett Brown	Courtney Hancock	Jordan Mercer
2015/16	18	Jordan Mercer	Kirsty Higgison	Brodie Moir	Georgia Miller	Maddy Dunn
2017	20	Harriet Brown	Courtney Hancock	Karlee Nurthen	Maddy Dunn	Georgia Miller
2017/18	20	Brielle Cooper	Harriet Brown	Georgia Miller	Lana Rogers	Courtney Hancock
2018/19	20	Georgia Miller	Maddy Dunn	Lana Rogers	Kirsty Higgison	Brielle Cooper
2019/20	20	Lana Rogers	Georgia Miller	Lizzie Welborn	Harriet Brown	Danielle McKenzie
2020/21	20	Lana Rogers	Georgia Miller	Lizzie Welborn	Danielle McKenzie	Tiarnee Massie
2021/22	21	Harriet Brown	Danielle McKenzie	Courtney Hancock	Hannah Sculley	Aly Bull
2022/23	22	Georgia Miller	Lizzie Welborn	Danielle McKenzie	Lucy Derbyshire	Tiarnee Massie
2023/24	28	Lana Rogers	Georgia Miller	Olivia Corrin	Electra Outram	Tiarnee Massie
2024/25	28	Lucy Derbyshire	Tiarnee Massie	Lizzie Welborn	Georgia Fitzsimmons	Electra Outram

In the 2010/11 series, Pluimers won four of the five rounds, but her 17th-place finish in the fourth round meant she finished second in the series, six points behind series winner Courtney Hancock.

== Men's series results (top five) ==
Season	Competitors	Winner	Second	Third	Fourth	Fifth
1986/87		Darren Mercer				
1987/88		Darren Mercer				
1988/89		Darren Mercer				
1989/90		Trevor Hendy				
1990/91		Darren Mercer				
1991/92		Darren Mercer				
1992/93		Darren Mercer				
1993/94		Darren Mercer				
1994/95		Dean Mercer				
1995/96		Dean Mercer				
1996/97		Dean Mercer				
1997/98	Nil	Not conducted				
1998/99		Dean Mercer				
1999/00		Zane Holmes				
2000/01		Zane Holmes				
2001/02		Ky Hurst				
2002/03		Shannon Eckstein	Dean Mercer	Steve Meredith		
2003/04		Zane Holmes				
2004/05		Zane Holmes		Shannon Eckstein		
2005/06		Shannon Eckstein	Pierce Leonard	Zane Holmes		
2006/07		Shannon Eckstein	Zane Holmes	Wes Berg	Dean Mercer	Nathan Smith
2007/08		Zane Holmes	Shannon Eckstein		Pierce Leonard	
2008/09		Shannon Eckstein	Zane Holmes	Matt Poole	Pierce Leonard	
2009/10	25	Shannon Eckstein	Hugh Dougherty	Ky Hurst	Rhys Drury	Corey Jones
2010/11	21	Shannon Eckstein	Matt Poole	Zane Holmes	Caine Eckstein	Hugh Dougherty, Wes Berg (tied)
2011/12	21	Caine Eckstein	Alastair (Ali) Day	Shannon Eckstein	Ky Hurst	Zane Holmes
2012/13	17	Shannon Eckstein	Kendrick Louis	Alastair (Ali) Day	Matt Poole	Ky Hurst
2013/14	16	Shannon Eckstein	Ky Hurst	Kendrick Louis	Matt Poole	Caine Eckstein
2014/15	15	Alastair (Ali) Day	Shannon Eckstein	Matt Poole	Ky Hurst	Kendrick Louis
2015/16	18	Shannon Eckstein	Alastair (Ali) Day	Matt Bevilacqua	Matt Poole	Luke Cuff
2017	20	Matt Poole	Shannon Eckstein	Kendrick Louis	Alastair (Ali) Day	Luke Cuff
2017/18	20	Matt Bevilacqua	Alastair (Ali) Day	James Lacy	Max Brooks	Shannon Eckstein
2018/19	20	Alastair (Ali) Day	Kendrick Louis	Matt Poole	Ben Carberry	Cory Taylor
2019/20	20	Kendrick Louis	Matt Bevilacqua	Matt Poole	Tanyn Lyndon	TJ Hendy
2020/21	20	Alastair (Ali) Day	Jy Timperley	Joe Collins	Matt Bevilacqua	Cory Taylor
2021/22	21	Alastair (Ali) Day	Matt Bevilacqua	Jy Timperley	Dan Collins	Kendrick Louis
2022/23	21	Matt Bevilacqua	Ben Carberry	Joe Collins	Cory Taylor	Finn Askew
2023/24	20	Alastair (Ali) Day	Joe Collins	Matt Bevilacqua	Zach Morris	Finn Askew
2024/25	28	Conner Maggs	Joel Piper	Zach Morris	Matt Bevilacqua	Finn Askew

== See also ==
- The Coolangatta Gold
- Uncle Toby's Super Series
