= Australian Surf Life Saving Championships =

Annual lifeguard competition

The Australian Surf Life Saving Championships known as The Aussies is the national Surf lifesaving championships for Australia. It is the largest surf lifesaving event in Australia and the largest event of its kind in the world. It is organised by Surf Life Saving Australia, and had been held annually since 1915.

The first Australian Surf Life Saving Championships were held at Bondi Beach, New South Wales in March 1915.

The first Surf Life Saving Australia (SLSA) Masters Championships took place in 1987. It has since become an annual event, providing a platform for experienced surf life savers to showcase their skills and compete at a high level.

== List of Championships ==
Year	Location
1909	Several New South Wales club carnivals held. No record of a State or National Carnival
1910	Several New South Wales club carnivals held. No record of a State or National Carnival
1911	Several New South Wales club carnivals held. No record of a State or National Carnival
1912	Mention in Annual Report of thanks to carnival officials only
1913	Several New South Wales club carnivals held. No record of a State or National Carnival
1914	Several New South Wales club carnivals held. No record of a State or National Carnival
1915	No carnivals held due to WW1
1916	No carnivals held due to WW1
1917	No carnivals held due to WW1
1918	No senior carnivals held due to WW1
1919	No Record in Annual Report. Spanish Flu mentioned as an issue against holding carnivals
1920	No Record in Annual Report
1921	Bondi Beach, New South Wales (Australian Surf Championships, New South Wales Division)
1922	Bondi Beach, New South Wales (Australian Surf Championships, New South Wales Division)
1923	Bondi Beach, New South Wales (Australian Surf Championships, New South Wales Division)
1924	Bondi Beach, New South Wales (Australian Surf Championships, New South Wales Division)
1925	Bondi Beach, New South Wales (Australian Surf Championships, New South Wales Division)
1926	Nth Bondi Beach, New South Wales (Australian Surf Championships, New South Wales Division)
1927	Bondi Beach, New South Wales (Australian Surf Championships, New South Wales Division)
1928	Bondi Beach, New South Wales (Australian Surf Championships, New South Wales Division)
1929	Bondi Beach, New South Wales (Australian Surf Championships, New South Wales Division)
1930	Bondi Beach, New South Wales (Australian Surf Championships, New South Wales Division)
1931	Bondi Beach, New South Wales (Australian Surf Championships, New South Wales Division)
1932	Bondi Beach, New South Wales (Sydney Harbour Bridge Opening)
1933	Bondi Beach, New South Wales
1934	Bondi Beach, New South Wales
1935	Bondi Beach, New South Wales
1936	Bondi Beach, New South Wales
1937	Bondi Beach, New South Wales
1938	Bondi Beach, New South Wales
1939	Manly Beach, New South Wales
1940	Bondi Beach, New South Wales
1941	Not Held due to WW2
1942	Not Held due to WW2
1943	Not Held due to WW2
1944	Not Held due to WW2
1945	Not Held due to WW2
1946	Maroubra Beach, New South Wales
1947	Southport Beach, Gold Coast, Queensland *First time held outside New South Wales
1948	Bondi Beach, New South Wales
1949	Bondi Beach, New South Wales
1950	Greenmount Beach, Gold Coast, Queensland
1951	Scarborough Beach, Western Australia
1952	North Wollonagong Beach, Newcastle, New South Wales
1953	Newport Beach, New South Wales
1954	Southport Beach, Gold Coast, Queensland
1955	North Steyne, New South Wales
1956	not held
1957	Torquay Beach, Victoria (December 1956)
1958	Scarborough Beach, Western Australia
1959	Mooloolaba Beach, Queensland
1960	Merewether Beach, New South Wales
1961	Moana Beach, South Australia
1962	Carlton Beach, Tasmania
1963	Warrnambool Beach, Victoria
1964	Collaroy Beach, New South Wales
1965	Scarborough Beach, Western Australia
1966	Coolangatta Beach, Gold Coast, Queensland
1967	Southport Beach, South Australia
1968	North Cronulla, New South Wales
1969	Clifton Beach, Tasmania
1970	Ocean Grove Beach, Victoria
1971	City of Perth Beach, Western Australia
1972	Blacksmiths Beach, Newcastle, New South Wales
1973	Burleigh Heads, Gold Coast, Queensland
1974	Glenelg, South Australia
1975	Dee Why Beach New South Wales
1976	Clifton Beach, Tasmania
1977	Bancoora Beach, Victoria
1978	Kingscliff Beach, New South Wales
1979	Trigg Island Beach, Western Australia
1980	Maroochydore Beach, Sunshine Coast, Queensland
1981	Wanda Beach, New South Wales
1982	Moana Beach, South Australia
1983	Clifton Beach, Tasmania
1984	Kurrawa Beach, Gold Coast, Queensland
1985	Pt Leo Beach, Mornington Peninsula, Victoria
1986	Moana Beach, South Australia
1987	Scarborough Beach, Western Australia
1988	Cronulla Beaches, New South Wales
1989	Burleigh Heads, Gold Coast, Queensland
1990	North Beach, Wollongong, New South Wales
1991	Scarborough Beach, Western Australia
1992	Collaroy Beach, New South Wales
1993	Kurrawa Beach, Gold Coast, Queensland
1994	Blacksmiths Beach, Newcastle, New South Wales
1995	Kurrawa Beach, Gold Coast, Queensland
1996	Kurrawa Beach, Gold Coast, Queensland
1997	Kurrawa Beach, Gold Coast, Queensland
1998	Kurrawa Beach, Gold Coast, Queensland
1999	Kurrawa Beach, Gold Coast, Queensland
2000	Kurrawa Beach, Gold Coast, Queensland
2001	Kurrawa Beach, Gold Coast, Queensland
2002	Kurrawa Beach, Gold Coast, Queensland
2003	Kurrawa Beach, Gold Coast, Queensland
2004	Kurrawa Beach, Gold Coast, Queensland
2005	Kurrawa Beach, Gold Coast, Queensland
2006	Kurrawa Beach, Gold Coast, Queensland
2007	Scarborough Beach, Western Australia
2008	Scarborough Beach, Western Australia
2009	Scarborough Beach, Western Australia
2010	Kurrawa Beach, Gold Coast, Queensland
2011	Kurrawa Beach, Gold Coast, Queensland
2012	Kurrawa Beach, Gold Coast, Queensland
2013	North Kirra Beach, Gold Coast, Queensland
2014	Scarborough Beach, Western Australia
2015	North Kirra Beach, Gold Coast, Queensland
2016	Maroochydore, Alexandra Headland and Mooloolaba beaches, Sunshine Coast, Queensland
2017	North Kirra Beach, Gold Coast, Queensland
2018	Scarborough Beach, Perth, Western Australia
2019	Broadbeach, Gold Coast, Queensland
2020	Broadbeach, Gold Coast, Queensland. Cancelled due to COVID-19 Virus
2021	Maroochydore, Alexandra Headland and Mooloolaba, Sunshine Coast, Queensland
2022	North Kirra Beach and Kurrawa Beach, Gold Coast, Queensland
2023	Scarborough and Trigg Island Perth WA
2024	Alexandra Headland, Maroochydore, Mooloolaba, Sunshine Coast, Queensland
2025	North Kirra and Tugun beaches, Gold Coast, Queensland
2026	North Kirra and Tugun beaches, Gold Coast, Queensland

== List of Championship Pointscore Winners ==
Year	Location
1970	need update
1971	need update
1972	need update
1973	need update
1974	need update
1975	need update
1976	need update
1977	need update
1978	need update
1979	need update
1980	need update
1981	need update
1982	need update
1983	need update
1984	Cronulla SLSC
1985	Southport SLSC
1986	Cronulla SLSC
1987	Southport SLSC
1988	Southport SLSC
1989	Surfers Paradise SLSC
1990	Manly SLSC
1991	Manly SLSC
1992	Cronulla SLSC
1993	Cronulla SLSC
1994	Cronulla SLSC
1995	Surfers Paradise SLSC
1996	Surfers Paradise SLSC
1997	Surfers Paradise SLSC
1998	Currumbin SLSC
1999	Currumbin SLSC
2000	Surfers Paradise SLSC
2001	Surfers Paradise SLSC
2002	Surfers Paradise SLSC
2003	Surfers Paradise SLSC
2004	Northcliffe SLSC
2005	Northcliffe SLSC
2006	Northcliffe SLSC
2007	Northcliffe SLSC
2008	Northcliffe SLSC
2009	Northcliffe SLSC
2010	Northcliffe SLSC
2011	Northcliffe SLSC
2012	Northcliffe SLSC
2013	Northcliffe SLSC
2014	Northcliffe SLSC
2015	Northcliffe SLSC
2016	Northcliffe SLSC
2017	Northcliffe SLSC
2018	Northcliffe SLSC
2019	Northcliffe SLSC
2020	Not held
2021	Northcliffe SLSC
2022	Northcliffe SLSC
2023	Northcliffe SLSC
2024	Northcliffe SLSC
2025	Northcliffe SLSC
2026	Northcliffe SLSC

== List of Ironman and Ironwoman Champions ==
Held at the Australian Surf Life Saving Championships every year, the Australian Ironman and Ironwoman Title is awarded to the winners of these events. The format is the same as for typical surf carnivals, a 10-to-20-minute race with a field of 150 competitors, which over several rounds of will be reduced to a final of 16 athletes. These are the blue ribbon events the Championships, and also the ones that attracts the most attention in terms of television and spectators on the beach. The events are typically the last events on the program, raced on a final day of competition. .

Year	Male Winner	Club	Event Location
1966	Hayden Kenny		Coolangatta QLD
1967	Barry Rodgers		Southport SA
1968	Barry Rodgers		Nth Cronulla NSW
1969	Barry Rodgers		Clifton TAS
1970	Fred Annesley		Ocean Grove VIC
1971	Norm Rabjohns		City of Perth WA
1972	Norm Rabjohns		Swansea NSW
1973	Ken Vidler		Burleigh QLD
1974	Simon Martin		Glenelg SA
1975	Ken Vidler		Dee Why NSW
1976	Ken Vidler		Clifton TAS
1977	John Holt		Bancoora VIC
1978	Robert Chapman		Kingscliff NSW
1979	Greg Allum	Wanda	Trigg Island WA
1980	Grant Kenny		Maroochydore QLD
1981	Grant Kenny		Wanda NSW
1982	Grant Kenny		Moana SA
1983	Grant Kenny		Clifton TAS
1984	Robert Chapman		Kurrawa QLD
1985	Dwanye Thuys		Point Leo VIC
1986	Dwanye Thuys		Moana SA
1987	Trevor Hendy		Scarborough WA
1988	Trevor Hendy		Sutherland NSW
1989	Dean Mercer		Burleigh QLD
1990	Trevor Hendy		Nth Wollongong NSW
1991	Trevor Hendy		Scarborough WA
1992	Trevor Hendy		Collaroy NSW
1993	Guy Andrews		Kurrawa QLD
1994	Trevor Hendy		Swansea NSW
1995	Dean Mercer		Kurrawa QLD
1996	Darren Mercer		Kurrawa QLD
1997	Darren Mercer		Kurrawa QLD
1998	Steven Pullen		Kurrawa QLD
1999	Ky Hurst		Kurrawa QLD
2000	Ky Hurst		Kurrawa QLD
2001	Ky Hurst		Kurrawa QLD
2002	Ky Hurst		Kurrawa QLD
2003	Shannon Eckstein		Kurrawa QLD
2004	Zane Holmes		Kurrawa QLD
2005	Nathan Smith		Kurrawa QLD
2006	Shannon Eckstein		Kurrawa QLD
2007	Pierce Leonard		Scarborough WA
2008	Shannon Eckstein		Scarborough WA
2009	Pierce Leonard		Scarborough WA
2010	not contested		Kurrawa QLD
2011	Shannon Eckstein		Kurrawa QLD
2012	Shannon Eckstein		North Kirra QLD
2013	Cameron Cole		North Kirra QLD
2014	Shannon Eckstein		Scarboro Beach
2015	Shannon Eckstein		North Kirra Beach, Gold Coast, Queensland
2016	Shannon Eckstein		Maroochydore, Alexandra Headland and Mooloolaba beaches, Sunshine Coast, Queensland
2017	not contested		North Kirra Beach, Gold Coast, Queensland
2018	Kenrick Louis		Scarborough Beach, Perth, Western Australia
2019	Max Brooks		Broadbeach, Gold Coast, Queensland
2020	not contested		Broadbeach, Gold Coast, Queensland. Cancelled due to COVID-19 Virus
2021	Alastair Day		Maroochydore, Alexandra Headland and Mooloolaba, Sunshine Coast, Queensland
2022	Alastair Day		North Kirra Beach and Kurrawa Beach, Gold Coast, Queensland
2023	Alastair Day		Scarborough and Trigg Island Perth WA
2024	Dan Collins		Alexandra Headland, Maroochydore and Mooloolaba - Sunshine Coast, Queensland
2025	Alastair Day		North Kirra Beach and Kurrawa Beach, Gold Coast, Queensland
2026	Ethan Callaghan		North Kirra Beach and Kurrawa Beach, Gold Coast, Queensland

Year	Female Winner	Club	Event Location
1992	Samantha O'Brien		Collaroy NSW
1993	Karla Gilbert		Kurrawa QLD
1994	Karla Gilbert		Swansea NSW
1995	Stacy Gartrell	Wanda	Kurrawa QLD
1996	Kirsty Holmes		Kurrawa QLD
1997	Stacy Gartrell	Wanda	Kurrawa QLD
1998	Kerri Thomas		Kurrawa QLD
1999	Kerri Thomas		Kurrawa QLD
2000	Kirsty Holmes		Kurrawa QLD
2001	Hayley Bateup		Kurrawa QLD
2002	Kristy Munroe		Kurrawa QLD
2003	Karla Gilbert		Kurrawa QLD
2004	Kristy Cameron		Kurrawa QLD
2005	Kristyl Smith		Kurrawa QLD
2006	Naomi Flood		Kurrawa QLD
2007	Kristy Harris		Scarborough WA
2008	Alicia Marriott		Scarborough WA
2009	Kristyl Smith		Scarborough WA
2010	not contested		Kurrawa QLD
2011	Courtney Hancock		Kurrawa QLD
2012	Rebecca Creedy		North Kirra QLD
2013	Courtney Hancock		North Kirra QLD
2014	Elizabeth Pluimers		Scarborough WA
2015	Elizabeth Pluimers		North Kirra Beach, Gold Coast, Queensland
2016	Rebecca Creedy		Maroochydore, Alexandra Headland and Mooloolaba beaches, Sunshine Coast, Queensland
2017	not contested		North Kirra Beach, Gold Coast, Queensland
2018	Lana Rogers		Scarborough Beach, Perth, Western Australia
2019	Georgia Miller		Broadbeach, Gold Coast, Queensland
2020	not contested		Broadbeach, Gold Coast, Queensland. Cancelled due to COVID-19 Virus
2021	Georgia Miller		Maroochydore, Alexandra Headland and Mooloolaba, Sunshine Coast, Queensland
2022	Georgia Miller		North Kirra Beach and Kurrawa Beach, Gold Coast, Queensland
2023	Naomi Scott		Perth WA, Scarborough and Trigg Island
2024	Lana Rogers		Alexandra Headland, Maroochydore and Mooloolaba - Sunshine Coast, Queensland
2025	Georgia Miller		North Kirra Beach and Kurrawa Beach, Gold Coast, Queensland
2026	Tiarnee Massie		North Kirra Beach and Kurrawa Beach, Gold Coast, Queensland

== See also ==
- Ironman (surf lifesaving)
- World Life Saving Championships
