= Water leg =

Water leg may refer to:

- Glossary of rail transport terms#Water leg
- a component of races in the sport of Ironman (surf lifesaving)
