= Lisa Curry =

Australian swimmer (born 1962)

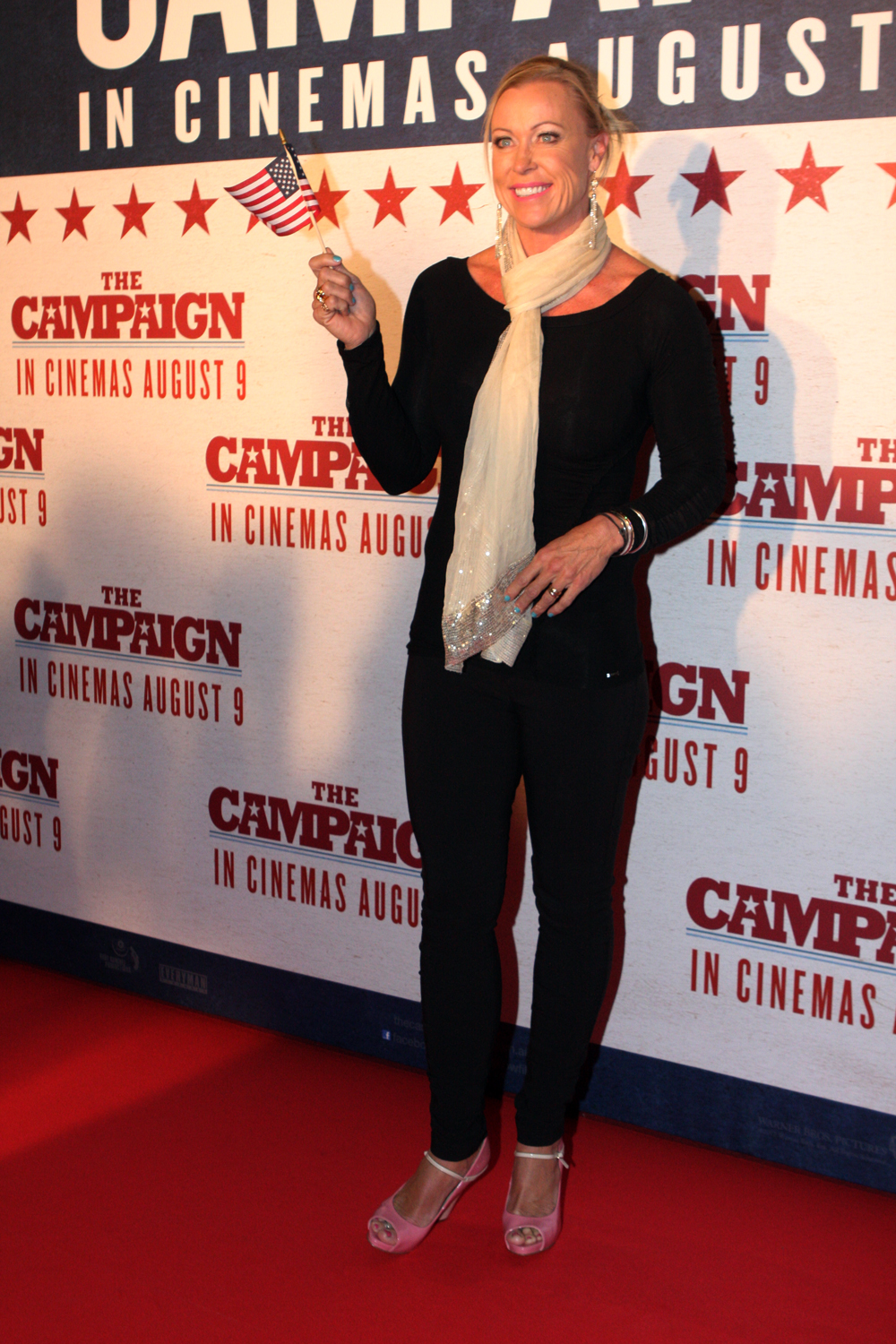
- Curry in 2012

Personal information
- Full name: Lisa Gaye Curry
- National team: (Australia)
- Born: 15 May 1962 (age 64) Brisbane, Queensland
- Height: 1.70 m (5 ft 7 in)
- Weight: 62 kg (137 lb)

Sport
- Sport: Swimming
- Strokes: Butterfly, medley, freestyle
Medal record
Women's swimming
Representing Australia
Commonwealth Games
Gold medal – first place	1982 Brisbane	100 m butterfly
Gold medal – first place	1982 Brisbane	200 m medley
Gold medal – first place	1982 Brisbane	400 m medley
Gold medal – first place	1990 Auckland	50 m freestyle
Gold medal – first place	1990 Auckland	100 m butterfly
Gold medal – first place	1990 Auckland	4×100 m freestyle
Gold medal – first place	1990 Auckland	4×100 m medley
Silver medal – second place	1978 Edmonton	4×100 m freestyle
Silver medal – second place	1990 Auckland	100 m freestyle
Bronze medal – third place	1982 Brisbane	100 m freestyle

Lisa Gaye Curry (born 15 May 1962), also known by her married name Lisa Curry-Kenny, is an Australian former competition swimmer.

Curry won seven gold, two silver and one bronze Commonwealth Games medals, and is the only Australian swimmer to have held Commonwealth and Australian records in every stroke except backstroke. Curry was the chair of the National Australia Day Council from 2000 to 2008.

== Swimming career ==
Curry's swimming ability was noticed at a young age and by the age of 12 was one of the fastest swimmers of her age in the world. She was an Australian Institute of Sport scholarship holder, and won 15 national long course open titles.

From 1977 to 1992, Curry represented Australia 16 times. She competed in the 1980, 1984 and 1992 Olympics; the 1978 and 1982 World Championships; and the 1978, 1982 and 1990 Commonwealth Games.

Curry won seven gold medals, two silver medals, and a bronze medal across three Commonwealth Games: a silver medal in the 4×100-metre medley relay at Edmonton in 1978; three gold medals (100-metre butterfly, 200- and 400-metre individual medley) and a bronze (100-metre freestyle) at Brisbane in 1982; and four gold medals (100-metre butterfly, 50-metre freestyle, 4×100-metre freestyle relay, 4×100-metre medley relay) and one silver (100-metre freestyle) at Auckland in 1990.

After retiring from swimming, she competed in surf boat rowing competitions and outrigger canoe events, and her team won the World Championship Outrigger Canoe event in 1997.

== Honours ==
On 31 December 1982, Curry was named a Member of the Order of the British Empire "in recognition of service to the sport of swimming". She was inducted into the Sport Australia Hall of Fame in 1985. At the 1994 Australia Day Honours, Curry was awarded the Medal of the Order of Australia "in recognition of service to the sport of swimming". On 14 July 2000, Curry was awarded the Australian Sports Medal for "her significant contribution as a competitor in swimming". On 1 January 2001, Curry was awarded the Centenary Medal for "service to Australian society through swimming and the National Australia Day Council". At the 2008 Australia Day Honours, Curry was named as an Officer of the Order of Australia "for service to the community through encouraging national pride and identity, particularly through leadership of the National Australia Day Council." In 2009 Curry was inducted into the Queensland Sport Hall of Fame.

== Television ==
In 2011, Curry appeared as a celebrity contestant on the first season of Nine Network's Australian reality series The Celebrity Apprentice Australia. Curry was fired in the 6th task.

She appeared in advertising campaigns for cruise liner P&O Cruises Australia and Uncle Tobys.

In January 2017, Curry was revealed as a celebrity contestant on the third season of Network Ten's Australian reality series I'm a Celebrity...Get Me Out of Here!. On 8 March 2017, Curry was the 9th celebrity eliminated from the series after 41 days in the jungle coming in 6th place.

Curry was the subject of the episode of Who Do You Think You Are? aired on 9 June 2020.

Lisa was the subject of an episode of Australian Story, on the ABC, called The Deep End, which aired in June 2022.

In 2022, Curry appeared on the fourth season of The Masked Singer Australia as Caterpillar and was the second contestant to be revealed.

== Business interests ==
Curry and former husband Grant Kenny co-own the Curry Kenny Aviation Group, which in 2009 owned approximately 60 aircraft. Curry has a partnership with Naturopath Jeff Butterworth in the company Happy Healthy YOU.

== Personal life ==
Curry was married to Grant Kenny, former ironman surf lifesaver and Olympic bronze medallist, in 1986. Curry and Kenny separated in May 2009. They had three children together; Jaimi, Morgan and Jett.

In 2008, Curry had a heart surgery operation to implant a defibrillator after being found to have an irregular heartbeat as a consequence of a viral infection.

In October 2016, Curry announced her engagement to entertainer Mark Andrew Tabone. They married in May 2018.

== See also ==
- List of Commonwealth Games medallists in swimming (women)
