= Thirroul =

- Suburb
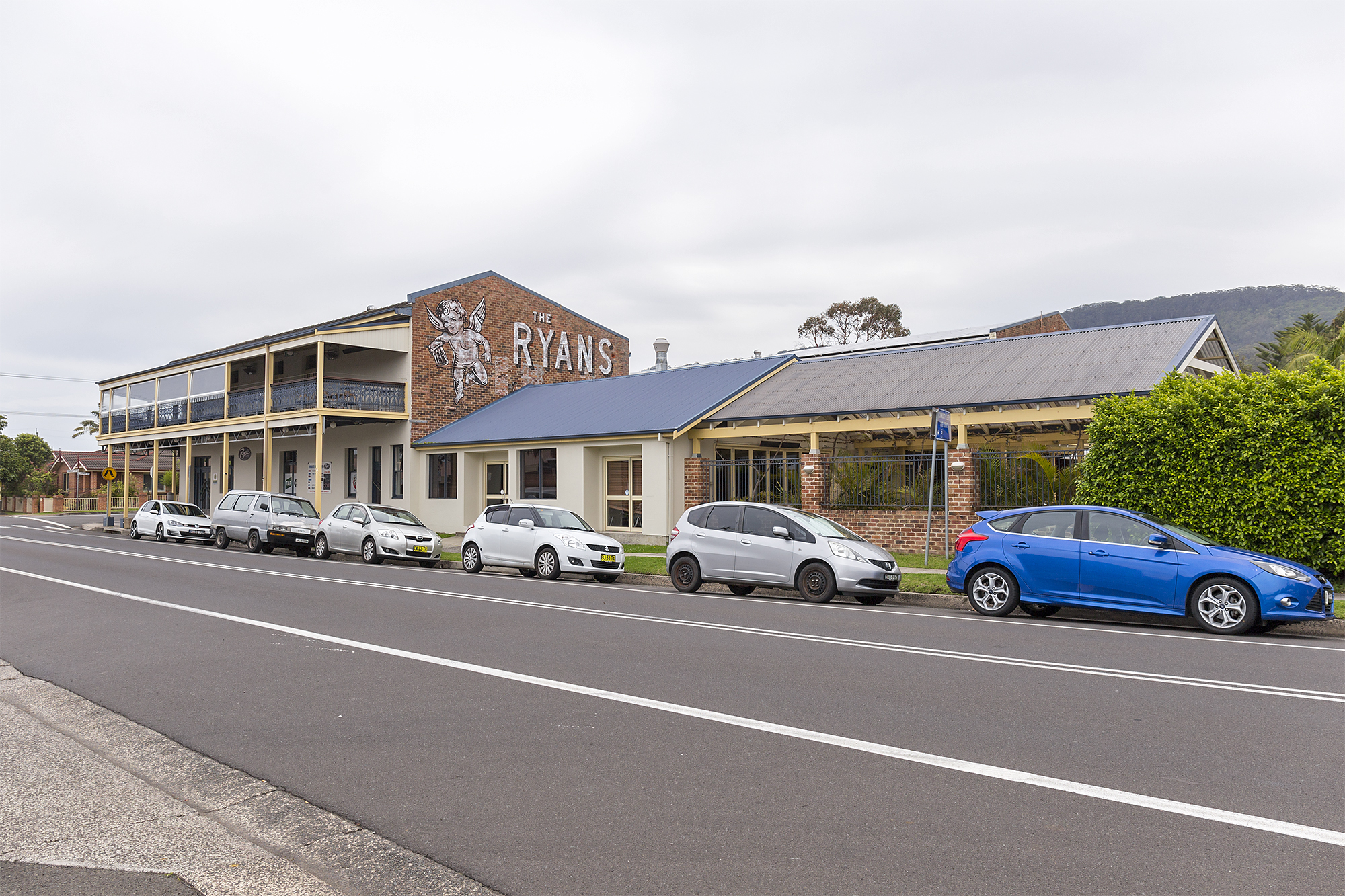
- Ryan's Hotel

- Coordinates: 34°18′59.3″S 150°55′7.9″E
- Country: Australia
- State: New South Wales
- City: Wollongong
- LGA: City of Wollongong
- Location: 73 km (45 mi) S of Sydney; 13 km (8.1 mi) N of Wollongong

Government
  - State electorate: Heathcote
  - Federal division: Cunningham
- Elevation: 18 m (59 ft)

Population
  - Total: 6,348 (2021 census)
- Postcode: 2515
Suburbs around Thirroul
Austinmer
Thirroul
Bulli

Thirroul (/θərʊl/) is a northern seaside suburb of the city of Wollongong, Australia. Situated between Austinmer and Bulli, it is approximately 13 kilometres north of Wollongong, and 73 km south of Sydney. It lies between the Pacific Ocean and a section of the Illawarra escarpment known as Lady Fuller Park, adjacent to Bulli Pass Scenic Reserve.

== Name ==
After European settlement had grown in the 1860s, the town was first called North Bulli, until it was renamed Robbinsville in 1880 after a local landowner, Frederick Robbins.

In 1887 the Railways Department opened a railway station in the town, and in 1892 officially adopted the name Thirroul. The source for this suggestion was probably Archibald Campbell, then owner and editor of the Illawarra Mercury, who was interested in Indigenous languages. His original manuscript transcription of the Aboriginal word for the cabbage tree palm which flourished in the area was Dthirrawell. In 1892, Port Kembla Aboriginal elder William Sadler said that the word Thirroul was meaningless. The proper term must be, he claimed, throon, referring to the bush leeches collected near the town. A local historian, Joseph Davis, cleared up the confusion in 1994, revealing that Campbell's original manuscript transliteration of the term, Dthirrawell was almost illegible, and a clerk had misread and mistranscribed it as Thirroul.

== History ==
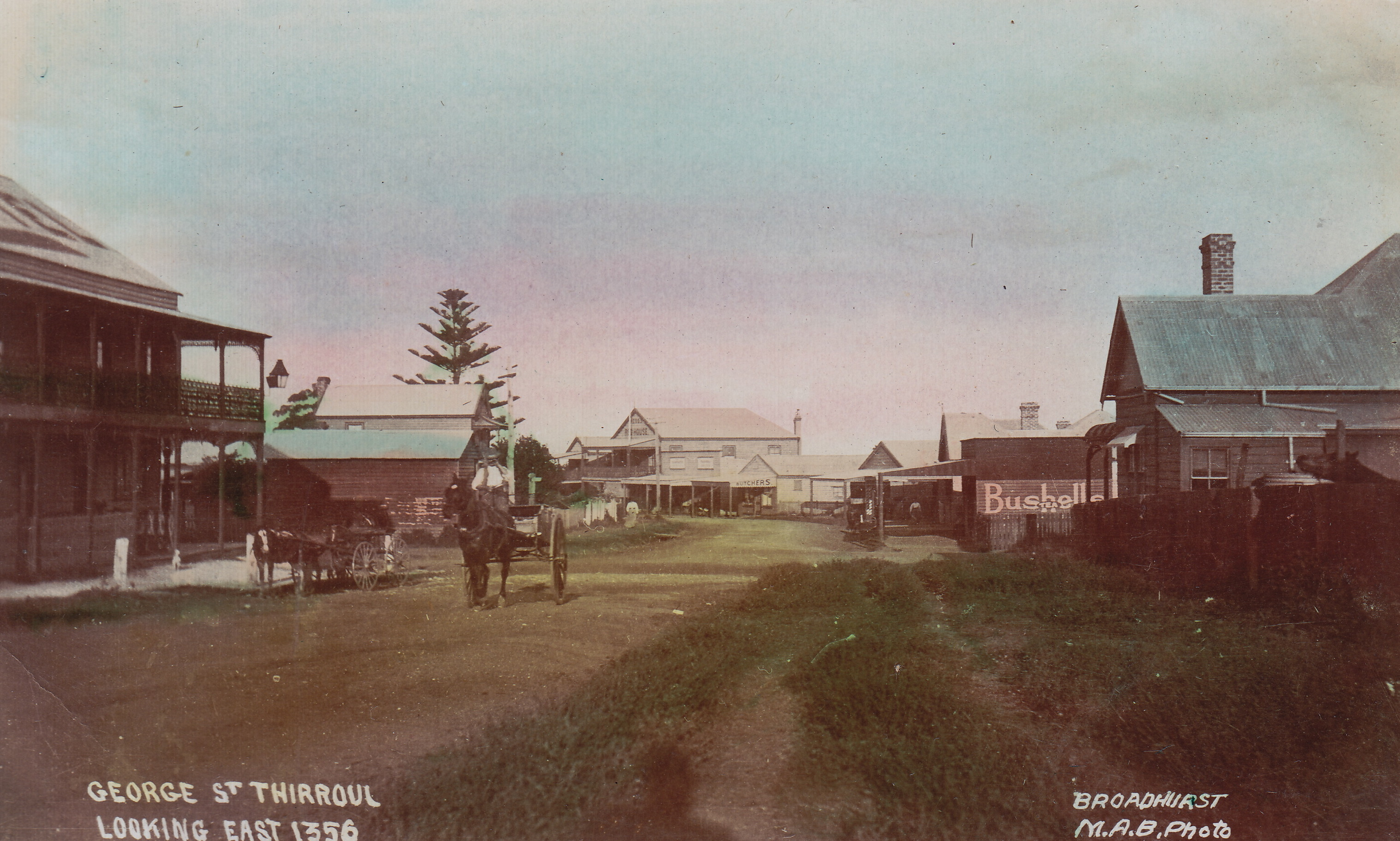
View of George Street, date unknown

Before European settlement, the land on which Thirroul is located had been occupied for at least 20,000 years by a subgroup of the Dharawal (or Tharawal) people. The Wodiwodi people spoke a dialect of Tharawal.

Cabbage-tree palms were once plentiful in the area and early white settlers harvested them to make strong fence posts. Stands of these trees are still visible on either side of Bulli Pass.

The first Europeans to settle in the area were loggers, who from around 1812 cut down some of many of the cedars in the area and shipped them to Sydney. People started to settle there in the 1860s, mostly on the hilly area as the coast was flood-prone.

Occupations consisted of farming, cedar logging, whaling and fruit growing and eventually mining when the Bulli Mine was opened in 1859 and the Bulli Jetty which shipped the coal from the mine opened in 1863. The township was known as North Bulli until February 1880 when the name of Robbinsville was chosen. The new name was decided upon at a meeting of ten men (including Frederick Robbins) in George's Whitford's "big new House" (located on the site of today's Ryans Hotel) in 1880. One suggestion for a name for the place was "Mudmire" but somehow Robbins convinced the others to call the town after himself. It only had a total population of 490 in 1891.

In 1888 the rail link with Sydney was finished. Early construction workers on the railway caused a population increase, and the eastern side of the town progressed rapidly. The Thirroul Locomotive Depot opened in 1917. It closed in 1965 and only the barracks for the accommodation of the railway crews remain. The Railway Institute Hall (opened in 1920) where workers once studied has been classified as a heritage building. The construction of the rail link also created an increase in tourism for Thirroul. It became a popular family seaside holiday destination with boarding houses and holiday cottages in demand.

Two known early residents include Samuel McCauley and Frederick Robbins. McCauley was one of the oldest residents of the Illawarra district when he died in June 1899 in Thirroul. A street in Thirroul has been named McCauley street. Robbins was a prominent resident who gave his name to the township of North Bulli as it was then called. He was made the first postmaster of Robbinsville in 1888 after, along with other residents, lobbying the government to supply a post office and railway platform.

In 1898 the Amy was shipwrecked on the rocks at the southern end of Thirroul beach. All of its crew died. A memorial to the Amy and her crew is located in the Thirroul Beach Park.

Coal mining operations began at the start of the 20th century and miners needed residences, though logging had been occurring before for some time.

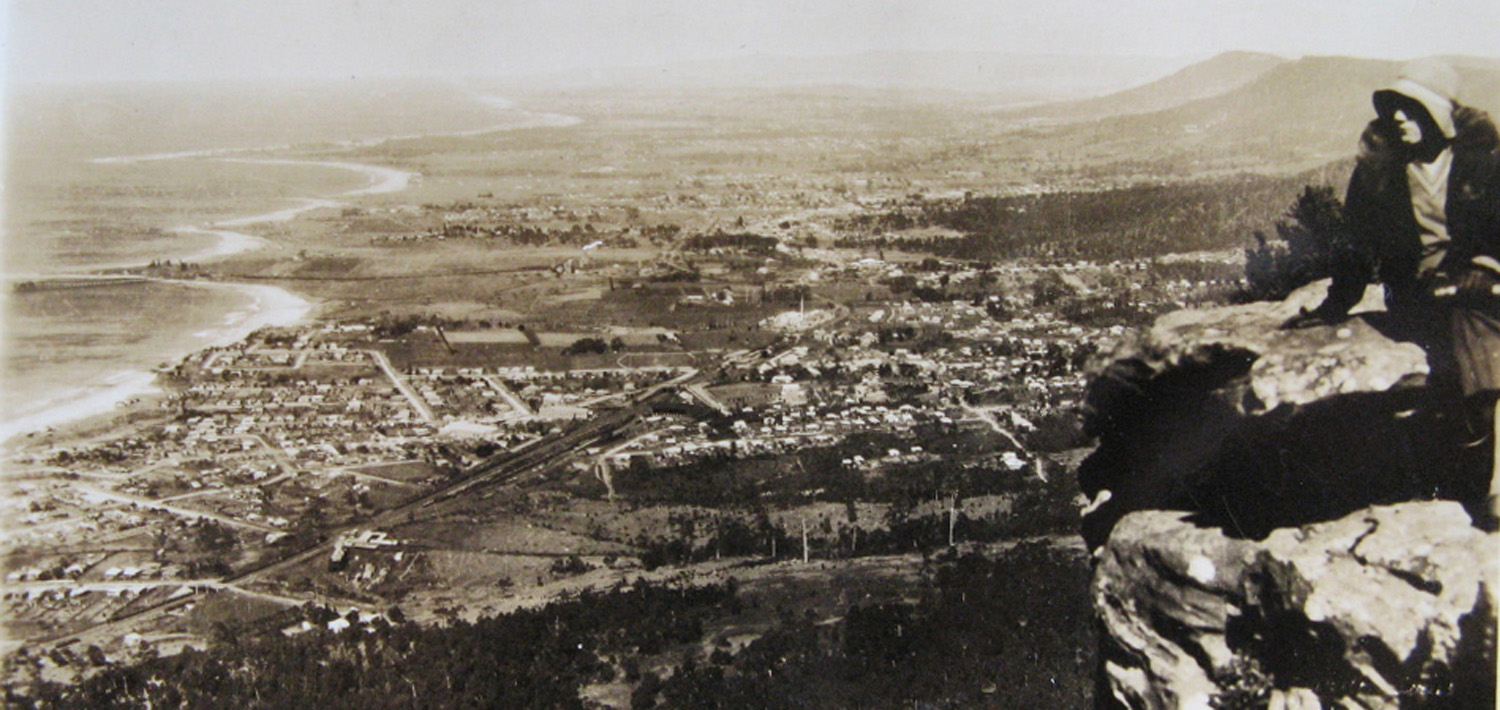
Thirroul circa 1920 showing the town as it was described by D. H Lawrence

The world-famous English author, D. H. Lawrence visited Thirroul in 1922 and wrote the novel Kangaroo about Australian fringe politics after the First World War whilst there. Overlooking the Pacific Ocean, his house Wyewurk is the earliest Australian bungalow to show the influence of the Californian Bungalow style of architecture. He gave this description of the town: "... The town trailed down from the foot of the mountain towards the railway, a huddle of grey and red painted iron roofs. Then over the rail line towards the sea, it began again in a spasmodic fashion ... There were wide unmade roads running straight as to go nowhere, with little bungalow homes ... Then quite near the inland, rose a great black wall of mountain or cliff ...".

A park and a monument (dedicated 21 November 1998) commemorate D H Lawrence's time at Thirroul, located on the same street as the house he stayed in.

The book D.H. Lawrence at Thirroul (1989), by Thirroul resident Joseph Davis, questioned many of the assumptions made by Robert Darroch in his 1981 work entitled D.H. Lawrence in Australia. The Cambridge edition of D.H. Lawrence's novel Kangaroo tended to accept the views of Davis rather than those of Darroch.

Michael Bialoguski, later to become a prominent player in the Petrov Affair (1954) and later still an orchestral conductor in the UK and Europe, had a medical practice in Thirroul in the late 1940s. The artist Brett Whiteley died from a heroin overdose in the Beachside Motel in Thirroul on 15 June 1992, aged 53.

The Thirroul Village Committee (TVC) was formed in 1983 because, in the words of Don Gray, "the town was looking rather tatty" and something needed to be done. Don was the founding chairperson and Lynne Jones, the founding Secretary. In 1983 the population of less than 5,000 qualified Thirroul as a village. In 1993 the TVC won the Basil Ryan gold award at the Rise & Shine Awards presentation for improved streetscapes. The Thirroul Seaside and Arts Festival, which is a successful community event, was the idea of Don Gray. The first festival was run in 1993. Lynne Jones organised the Festival for many years, building to the point where it was handed over to the Lions Club.

Another community event was "the Growing Green Kids Festival" – a not-for-profit event which was the brain-child of resident Cate Wilson (1948–2012). Cate was also President of the Thirroul Action Group (TAG) - an environmental group which has functioned for around 30 years. Residents concerned about health risks picketed against the Telstra phone tower in 1997. Storms and floods severely affected the Thirroul area in August 1998.

In August 2007, Thirroul's CBD and beach was declared an alcohol-free zone as a council initiative to prevent public drinking on streets and footpaths within the designated area.

In 2011 Thirroul resident Don Gray released a self-published book of his memories called My Thirroul illustrated by local artist, Christine Hill. A children's playground was opened by Wollongong Council with a plaque carrying their names on 4 July 2012. Some of the artwork evokes Gray's memories of an elephant stuck in the former Thirroul Beach lagoon on the current site of the playground – a story he recalled (and which Christine Hill illustrated) in his book. Gray died on 28 April 2013, aged 93 (Illawarra Mercury, 30 April 2013).

=== Anita's Theatre ===
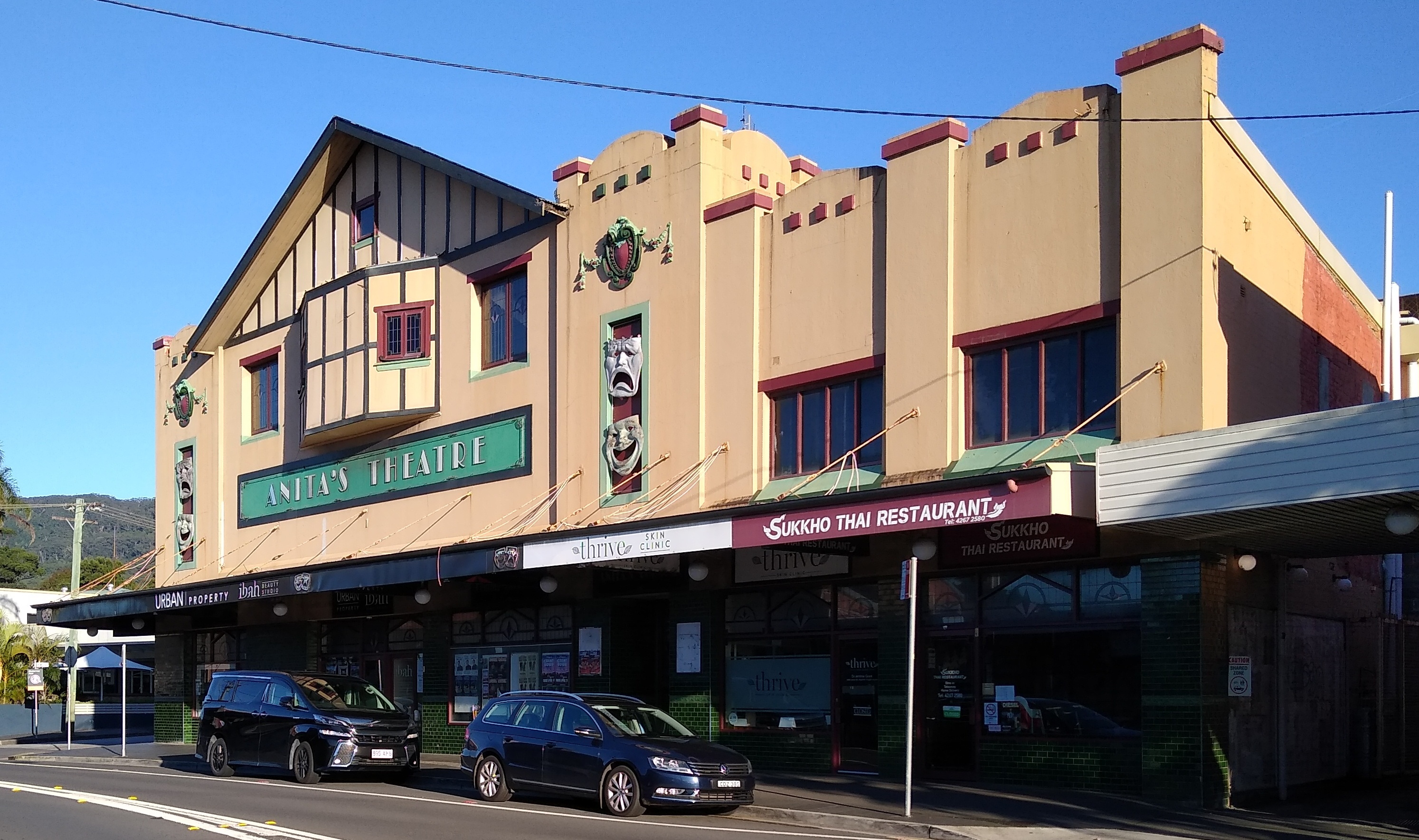
Anita's Theatre in 2022

King's Theatre, located at 264-270 Lawrence Hargrave Drive, was designed by renowned theatre architects Kaberry and Chard, and built for Wollongong Theatres in 1925. Officially opened on 22 October 1925, it accommodated an audience of 1,560, with 1,202 stalls seats, 248 circle seats, and four boxes along the side walls. The theatre was in continuous operation as a cinema until 1965 or 1966. (Note: Anita's theatre website says that it closed in April 1965 due to lack of patronage and reopened briefly between December 1965 and July 1966, but then closed permanently. Cinema Treasures says that it "closed on 18th December 1965 with Stephen Boyd in Genghis Khan and Carl Gonzales in The Little Ones".)

In April 1968, after all seating had been removed and a flat concrete floor laid, the building was converted into a roller-skating rink and opened as Skateland. It remained open as such until the mid-1990s.

In 2003, businessman John Comelli purchased the derelict building, and undertook extensive refurbishment to convert it back into a theatre. In 2007 it reopened as Anita's Theatre, to commemorate Comelli's deceased wife. Since then it has operated as a live performance venue, hosting concerts and live music.

In June 2011 the theatre was purchased for A$1.05 million by a consortium headed by Rennie Cristini. In 2013, the property sold for A$1.4 million.(Illawarra Mercury, 15 November 2013).

In 2019, Midnight Oil launched their "The Final Tour" at Anita's Theatre.

In July 2022, Live Nation Australia Venues Pty Ltd acquired the operations of Anita's Theatre, with a view to providing a good regional live music venue for Australian artists.

== Heritage listings ==
Thirroul has a number of heritage-listed sites, including:

- Illawarra railway: Thirroul railway station

== Commerce & services ==
The town's major commercial area lies between an area just north of Bulli Pass, where the Princes Highway splits to form the Lawrence Hargrave Drive, to Thirroul Station, over the bridge and past the main centre and the Anita's Theatre building. Supermarkets include a Coles and IGA. Thirroul is steadily growing in population, and many new shops are added regularly. Many cafes now exist in Thirroul's main commercial area, adding to its popularity as a seaside holiday town. Thirroul has many fashion, gift and lifestyle shops along the main streets.

The boutique clothing and jewellery shops, florists, supermarkets, news agencies and other shopping essentials make it the main shopping area for the northern suburbs of Wollongong. Desiderate Jewellery, an online jewellery business specialising in sterling silver and gemstone jewellery, is based in Thirroul. Thirroul also has a sub-branch of the Returned and Services League of Australia (RSL).

Thirroul is also home to King's Theatre (1913), which underwent large-scale renovations in 2006/2007 and was renamed to Anita's Theatre by the developer John Comelli, in honour of his late wife. Anita's Theatre was for sale as of May 2010 but was purchased for 1.05 million dollars in 2011 by a Balgownie business man. The boutique clothing and jewellery shops, florists, supermarkets, news agencies and other shopping essentials make it the main shopping area for the northern suburbs of Wollongong. Thirroul also has a sub-branch of the Returned and Services League of Australia (RSL).

Thirroul is part of the Northern Illawarra Chamber of Commerce, which was established in 1996 and is recognised as an official body by the Wollongong City Council. Its aim is to promote the identity of the Northern Illawarra in co-operation with local business owners, the residents community, and government and tourism bodies to generate local business growth for the region.

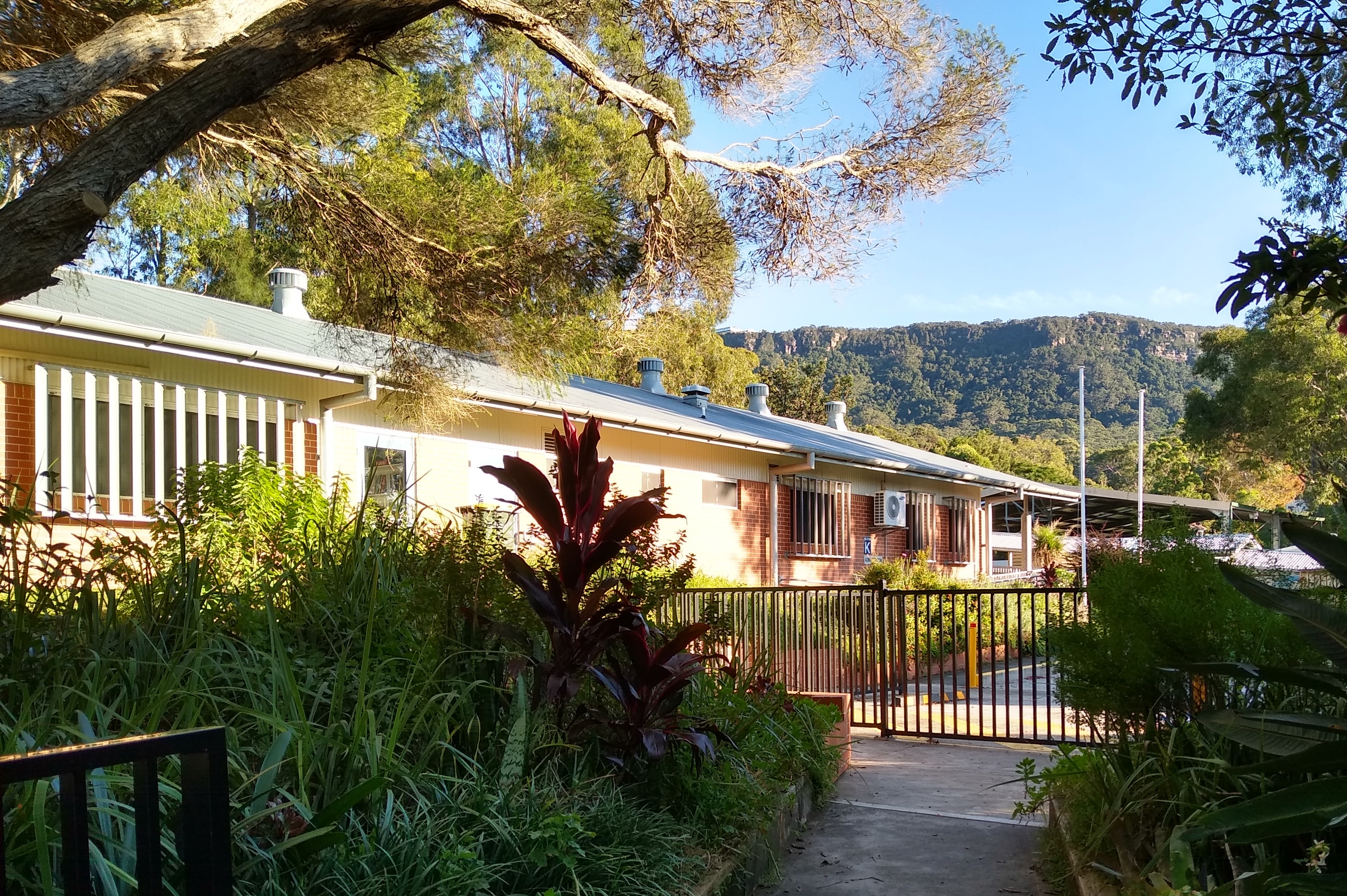
Thirroul Public School

There are two primary schools, St. Michael's and Thirroul Public School. St. Michael's is a Catholic school that was established by the Sisters of St. Joseph in 1940 and is located in Station Street. Thirroul Public school was established in 1889 after Frederick Robbins sold one acre of his land, "well situated and elevated, being the centre of population", to the Department of Education for the purpose of building a school and teacher's residence. The school subsequently opened in 1889 with 154 children on the roll. Thirroul Public School is located in Roxburgh Avenue. Thirroul also has a Thirroul Scout Group as part of the Scout Association of Australia, NSW Branch.

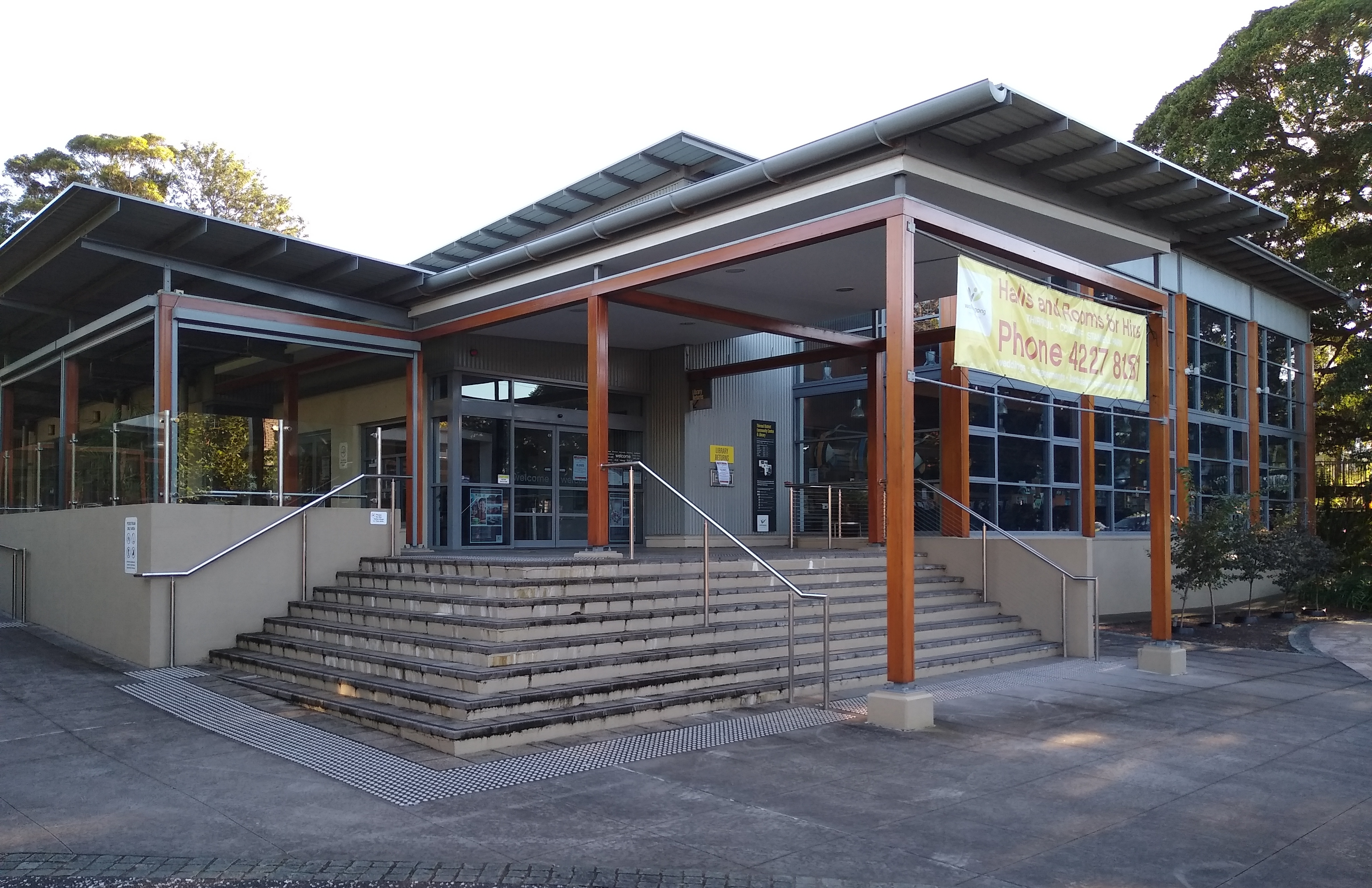
Thirroul District Community Centre and Library

In June 2009, the new Thirroul District Library and Community centre was opened. This library offers email and word processing, inter-library loans, photocopying and printing, free Internet access and children's programs.

The annual Thirroul Seaside & Arts Festival is held over a weekend in the first week of April. It includes activities such as art exhibitions and workshops, kids activities, live stage entertainment, buskers, a variety of stalls, pony and carnival rides and face painting. The festival won the 2003 Illawarra tourism Award in the events/festivals category. Involved in organising the event is the Austimer-Thirroul Lions Club. The festival actively involves community organisations, educational institutions, sporting groups, performing and visual art studios, scouts, surf lifesavers and the general public.

Thirroul's independent retail and hospitality sector includes a range of locally operated businesses. These include Byrne Surfboards, a local surfboard manufacturer; Poppy's Florist, a florist supplying fresh flowers and arrangements; Seafoam Cafe, serving coffee and food prepared on the premises; Lea Munro Boutique, an independent women's clothing retailer; and Desiderate Jewellery, an Australian jewellery business specialising in handcrafted sterling silver and gemstone jewellery and operating an online store.

== Demographics ==
In the 2021 census, there were 6,348 people in Thirroul. 80.2% of residents were born in Australia compared to 74.9% for the Wollongong Local Government LGA. The next most common countries of birth in Thirroul were England at 6.0% and New Zealand at 1.7%. In addition, 90.2% of the Thirroul population only spoke English in the home, compared with 79.8% for the Wollongong LGA.

The most common responses for religion were No Religion 48.9%, Catholic 22.1% and Anglican 12.9%.

The median weekly household income for Thirroul was $2,751, which is higher than the Wollongong LGA median of $2,151. Levels of qualification in Thirroul are also higher than the Wollongong LGA, with 60% of population completing tertiary education compared with an average of 47% across the LGA. Of the employed people in Thirroul, 4.0% worked in Higher Education. Other major industries of employment included Hospitals 5.0%, Secondary Education 3.3% and Primary Education 3.2%.

Many former Sydneysiders have moved to Thirroul and now commute to work from the northern area. Real estate prices have significantly increased in recent years. The price of a now near derelict house with ocean glimpses in Spray Street Thirroul increased from $80,000 in 1986 to selling for $1,560,000 on 7 May 2016 - an increase of some 1900%. Few employment opportunities exist in the suburb with much of the labour force commuting to Sydney for work.

== Transport ==
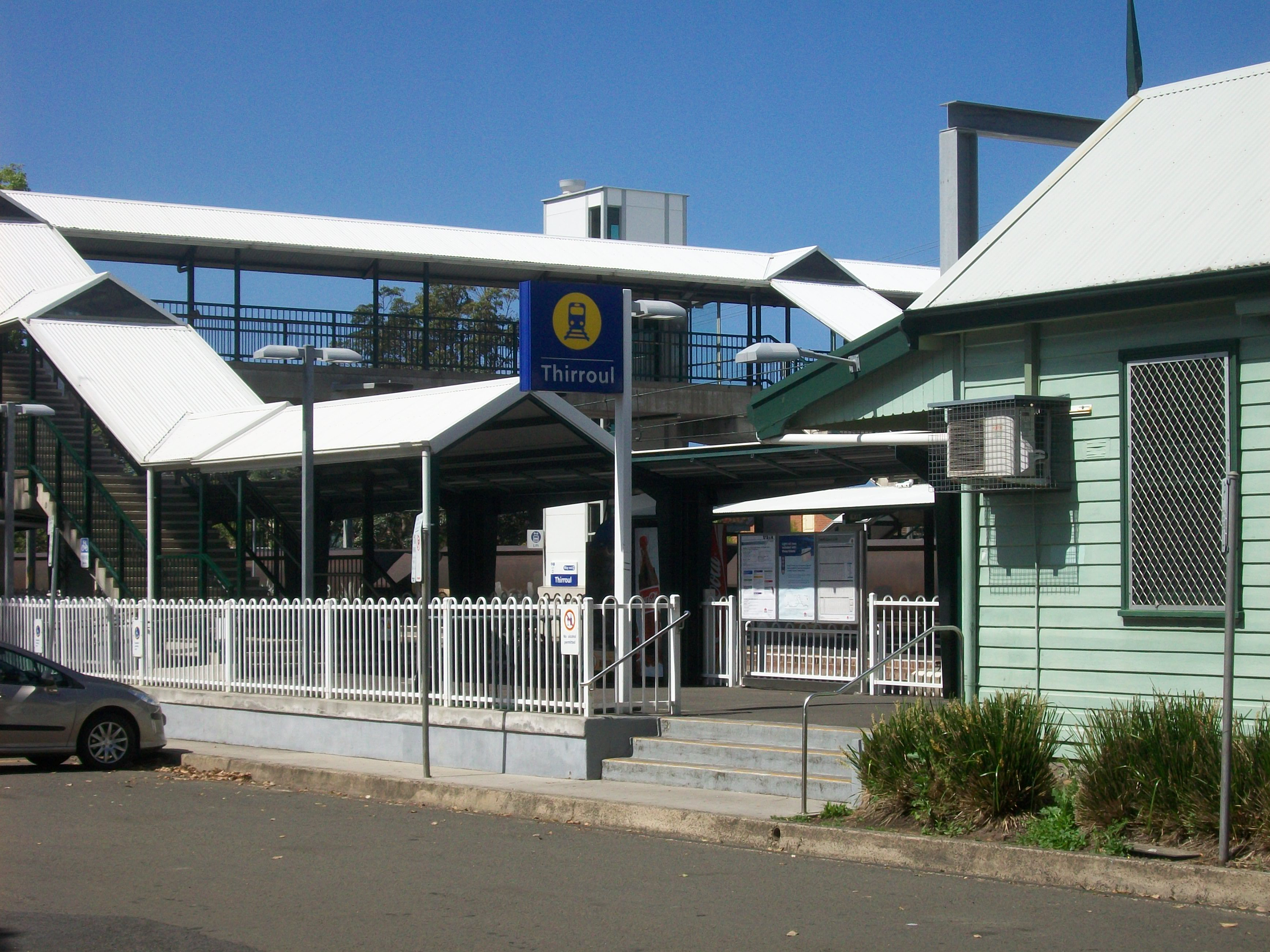
Entrance to the railway station

Thirroul railway station is a major station on the NSW TrainLink South Coast line. Although not as important as in steam days, it is the major station between Wollongong and the Sydney metropolitan area. Local Wollongong suburban services terminate at Thirroul, while all Intercity services stop at Thirroul, both express and all stations trains. In 2005, the station was equipped with lifts.

Thirroul retains a number of passing / refuge sidings for the many coal trains from Metropolitan Colliery and the western coalfields which pass through the town.

Lawrence Hargrave Drive starts just south of Thirroul at the Princes Highway in Bulli and travels north through Thirroul, connecting with the Old Princes Highway and Southern Freeway at the Helensburgh exit.

== Thirroul Beach ==
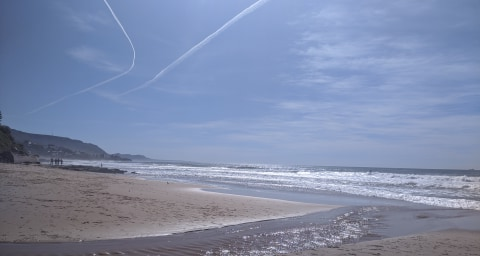
An image of Thirroul Beach taken from neighbouring McCauley's Beach

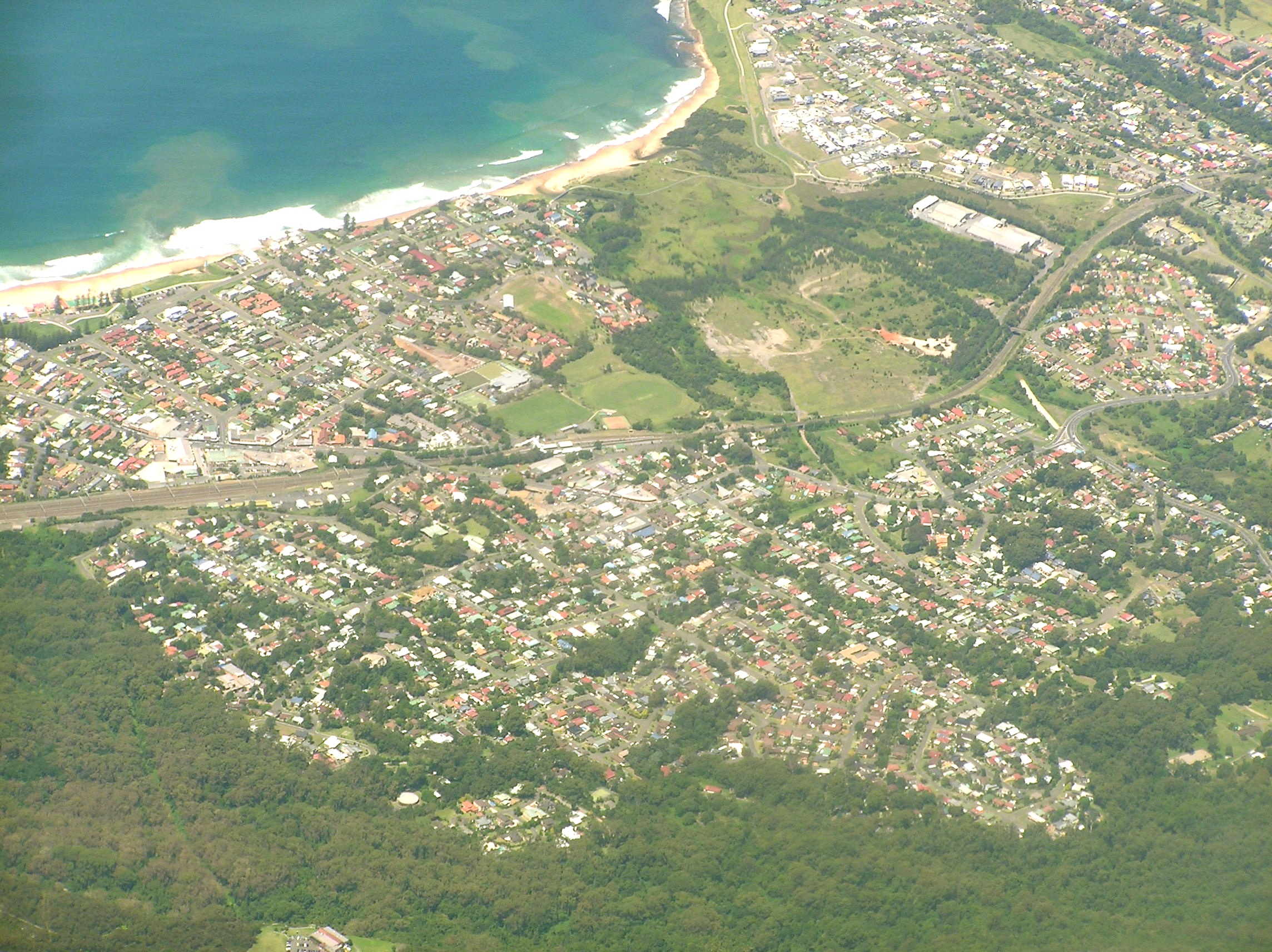
Aerial photo from north west

Thirroul beach is a prominent feature, as well as the backdrop of the 400 metres (1,300 feet) high escarpment, attracting many bush-walkers to northern Austinmer and surfers to both beaches. The beach is popular with both locals and tourists, becoming particularly busy in summer months and long weekends. The beach is 1 kilometre (0.62 miles) long and backed by a large, grassy reserve. Swimming can be potentially hazardous because of permanent and shifting rips. The beach is patrolled in summer and a 50 metres (160 feet) ocean pool is located near the beach.

The Thirroul Surf Lifesaving Club was established in 1907 as one of 14 foundation clubs in NSW. The SLSC is the home of the Thirroul Seagulls IRB (Inflatable rescue boat) Racing Team, who have competed strongly for the last 15 years. Former Ironman champions Darren and Dean Mercer are from Thirroul and their parents still reside in the town.

The southern end of Thirroul Beach is also known as McCauley's Beach. McCauley's Beach is separated from Thirroul Beach proper by rock platforms and is a popular off-leash dog beach.

Thirroul is an exposed beach and reef break, and has reliable surf all year. The most desirable wind for surfing there is offshore winds from the west north-west. Most of the surf comes from |groundswells, with the best swell direction the south-east. The beach break provides for both left and right-handers. Caution should be taken with rips, rocks, sharks and, during the summer, bluebottles.

== Natural environment and wildlife ==
Recorded birds in the northern suburbs of Wollongong include the Australian King Parrot, Crimson Rosella, Eastern Sea Eagle and the Brown Gerygone.

The Sandon Point Stockland development, has given rise to much controversy and conflict between developers and environmental and Aboriginal groups over Aboriginal heritage and coastal wetland and floodplain since 1989, is just south in Bulli. Dootch Kennedy, Al Oshlack and Karen Gough have co-ordinated a series of legal actions against the development's impact on Aboriginal heritage. This protest is ongoing, and included a 24/7 picket for five years before an arson attack. Continuing Aboriginal Tent Embassy Resident Jill Walker has been taking Stockland and the Minister for Planning to both the Land and Environment and Supreme Courts over a number of outstanding non-Aboriginal environmental issues relating to the development. It is also the starting/finishing point to the bike track that runs south to Wollongong, the Wollongong to Thirroul Bike Track. The escarpment area is rich in its variety of birdlife.

== Sport ==
Sporting teams have been a prominent part of Thirroul history and the "working class" people that established the village. Many of the existing sporting clubs having history dating back to the early settlement.

Thirroul is represented in the Tooheys Illawarra Rugby League by the Thirroul Butchers. The Butchers were established in 1913. The Thirroul Butchers attract crowds between 500 and 1500 a game, depending on their opponents.

Thirroul is also home to the Thirroul Junior Football Club (TJFC). The club consists of many male & female junior teams ranging from under 6's to under 18's, 4 senior women's sides and 3 senior men's. In 2002 the first senior women's football side was entered into the local IWSA competition, that team went on to finish third in their inaugural season. The first senior men's side, the Thunder, was established for the 2008 season. That same year the women's sides became affectionately known as: 'The Thunderbirds'. As of 2026 Thirroul is the only club in the Illawarra to enter a women's team into each of the IWFA's 4 competitions: Premier / Reserve Grade, Division 1 and Over 30s.

Football (soccer) is played at the southern end of the local Thomas Gibson Park and rugby league is held at the northern end which has a large grandstand. Thirroul is also part of the Northern Suburbs Netball Club. The Thirroul Amateur Swimming Club has been operating in Thirroul since 1954. Swim nights are conducted weekly between October and March. The club is non-profit and affiliated with NSW Swimming.

Thirroul District Cricket Club was established in 1896. It is believed the original home ground was the current site of Slacky Flat, before games moved to Gibson Park in the early 1900s. In 1976/77, Woonona Cricket Club folded and merged with Thirroul Cricket Club. In the mid-1990s, the unenviable decision to relocate the club's home ground to Hollymount Park, Woonona was made and in 1996 the Senior division of the club underwent a name change from Thirroul Cricket Club to Northern Districts Cricket Club. Initially matches were played on the western turf pitch of Hollymount Park however in 2005 a new five (5) pitch turf wicket square was installed on the Eastern side of Hollymount Park and the Eastern clubhouse was redeveloped. The junior division of the club incorporates both names as Thirroul & Northern Districts Cricket Club.

== Development pressures ==
It is an easy commute from Thirroul to Sydney CBD by train. This has made it a popular destination for city dwellers looking for a 'sea-change'. Thirroul has many well-proportioned housing blocks. These are either being re-developed, or dual-occupied, increasing housing density in the Suburb. This has put pressure on the road infrastructure. Lawrence Hargrave Drive is the only through road in the northern suburbs of the Illawarra. The increased dwelling density is seeing a growth in congestion on the main arterial route.

Thirroul is one of only two designated villages in the Wollongong Local Government Area. The backdrop to the Thirroul town centre is the iconic Illawarra escarpment. Key to the village atmosphere is the shopping strip where residents and tourists can easily park in the village to visit local cafes and shops. Residents are concerned that the village feel of the suburb is threatened by the increased development pressures being placed on the area.

In early 2020 a large development application was lodged for the redevelopment of the Thirroul Plaza site. The current plaza is a single storey, purely commercial enterprise, and contains no residences. The application (DA-2020/363) proposes a three-storey structure that would retain the commercial operation and see 80 residential units developed on the site. The size of the structure would also significantly impair the view to the escarpment from the village shopping strip. The development also requires the elimination of most of the kerbside parking in the village. Business owners and residents alike are very concerned about the impact this development will have on Thirroul village.

In 2020 a group called Save Thirroul Village was set up to work alongside the Thirroul Village Committee to oppose the development application proposing the redevelopment of the Thirroul Plaza site. STV was formed to assist the community in lodging objections. A number of objections from local residents and businesses were lodged against this development over the four iterations of the application. The groups are working together to promote the best outcomes for development within Thirroul.

== In popular culture ==
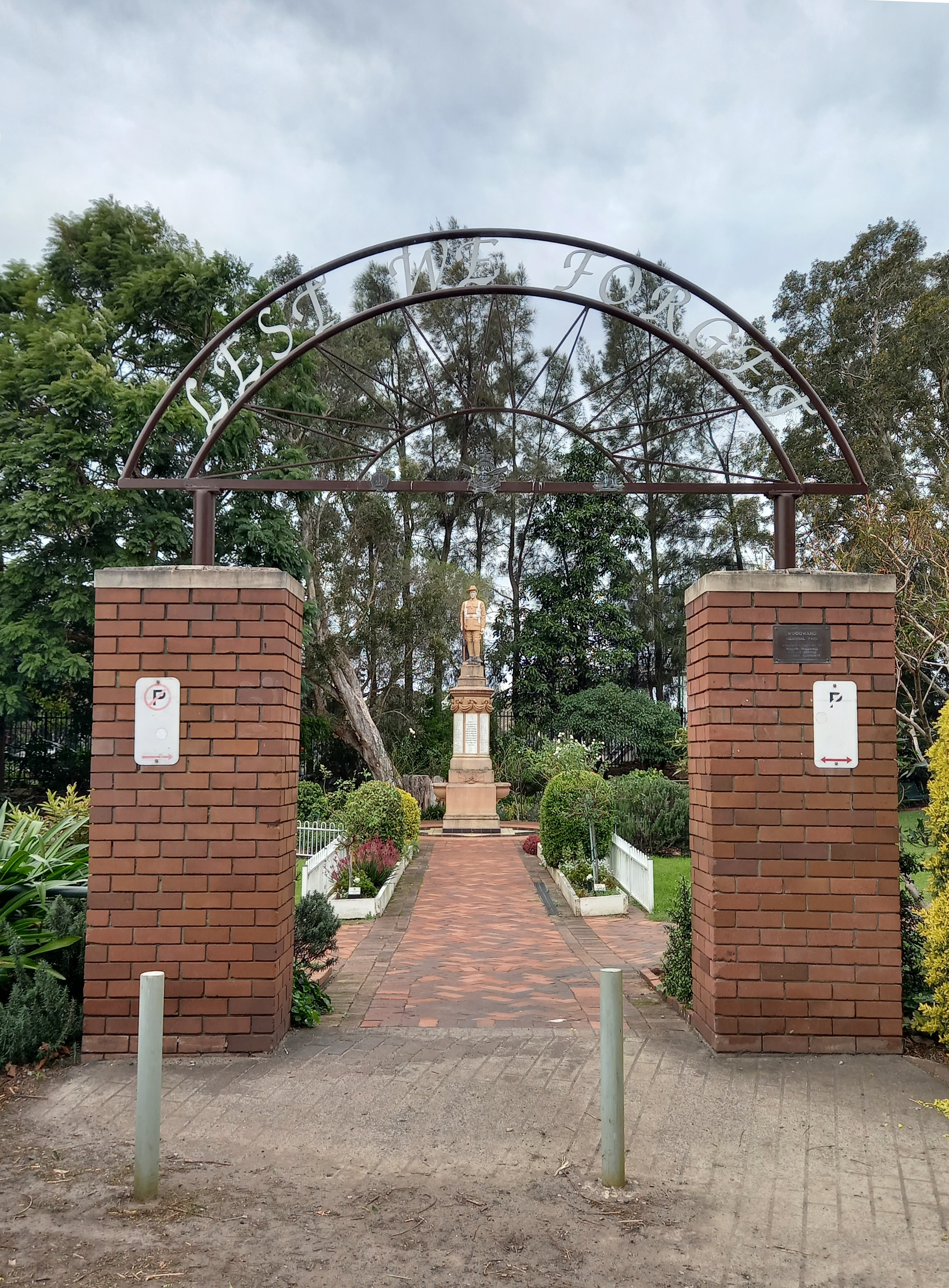
Thirroul War Memorial

Thirroul features in the musical piece Small Town by Australian composer Peter Sculthorpe. A note published by Faber Music states that forty years after the visit of D.H. Lawrence and his novel Kangaroo, "Peter Sculthorpe envisaged Thirroul as the quintessential Australian town, frozen in a more innocent time". The music evokes the architecture of the town, the township monument and includes a rendering of the Last Post evoking an Anzac Day ceremony at the town war memorial.

== Churches ==
- St Michael's Catholic Church
- St David's Anglican Church
- C3 Church Thirroul

== Notable people ==
- Phyllis Mary Nicol (1903–1964) was a University of Sydney physics lecturer and demonstrator in physics. She was born here.
- John Douglas Gibson – ornithologist
- Dean Mercer – ironman
- Graeme Wynn – rugby league player
