= The Coolangatta Gold =

Ironman surf lifesaving event

The Coolangatta Gold is one of the premier events in the sport of Ironman (surf lifesaving). The event is organised by Surf Life Saving Australia.

== The Event ==
=== History ===
In 1984, Peter Schrek was writing a movie featuring the talents of ironman legend Grant Kenny, about two brothers competing for their father's love. Needing a dramatic climax for the movie, Schrek was sitting on a Gold Coast beach when he came up with the idea of racing from Surfers Paradise, all the way down to Coolangatta, and back up again. Schrek ran up to someone on the beach, and after explaining the course, asked if he would do it, to which the person replied, "Hell no". Schreck then asked if he would do it for $20,000 prize money, to which the person replied, "Hell Yeah".

For the filming of the race, the producers decided to run The Coolangatta Gold as an actual event, rather than film set up shots. Many well-known ironmen at the time competed, but it was won by the unheralded 18-year-old Guy Leech, from Manly. Leech went on to win the second race in 1985 in conjunction with the movie premiere, and again in 1989 in The Gold Coast Gold. The race was run again in 1991 and 1992, won by Michael King and Darren Mercer respectively (with local Daiman Cartan coming a very close second both times), before escalating costs prevented it from being held again.

In 2005, it was on again, this time with a new women's and master's events. In the men's race, Caine Eckstein would mirror the events of the original race and the movie, running past his brother Shannon Eckstein, and defeating much more recognised ironmen in Zane Holmes, Dean Mercer and Jeremy Cotter.

The 2006 race saw Zane Holmes become the only ironman in history to win a series title, and Australian title, a World Championship and the Coolangatta Gold. 2007 continued the tradition of upsets with veteran Rhys Drury making a break in the board leg and taking win. The period from 2008 to 2011 saw a domination from Caine Eckstein. After returning to win his second title in 2008, Eckstein was pushed all the way in 2009 by veteran Dean Mercer, and in doing so, broke race record pace by over ten minutes, and equalled Guy Leech's record of three wins. In 2010, after racing with Cory Hill in the ski leg down to Coolangatta, Eckstein broke away to win by almost ten minutes, and became the first competitor to win three in a row. He extended this record in 2011, and his victories now stands at five.

The period from 2012 to 2021 was dominated by Ali Day who won every Coolangatta Gold he contested. In 2013 Day became only the third competitor to win the event twice. In 2014 the event celebrated 30 years. Defending champion Ali Day did not contest the race due to fatigue and injury. During the board leg, in a bid to win his sixth crown, Caine Eckstein tore his bicep and was forced to withdraw. Josh Minogue broke through for his maiden victory after placing third three times in four years and retired from surf racing. In 2015 Ali Day returned and beat Nathan Smith, becoming only the second competitor to win the event three times. Day won again in 2016 beating his former Mooloolaba training partner Matt Bevilacqua. The 2017 race began with a minute's silence for Dean Mercer who died in August 2017. All competitors wore black wrist bands with the inscription “Doing it for Dean”. Shannon Eckstein returned to contest the event for the first time in 9 years. Ali Day and Shannon Eckstein were locked together in the opening ski leg, but Day increased his lead on each successive leg to finish more than six minutes ahead of Shannon Eckstein and equal Caine Eckstein's record of 5 wins. In 2018 Ali Day claimed a record-breaking sixth Coolangatta Gold crown by a record margin finishing 21 minutes ahead of 2nd placed Max Beattie of New Zealand. After breaking both wrists in July 2019 and the cancellation of the 2020 event due to COVID-19 restrictions, Ali Day returned in 2021 to win a historic 7th Coolangatta Gold and become the first Ironman in history to take out the triple Ironman crown in the same year - the Nutri-Grain Grain Ironman, Australian Ironman crown and the Coolangatta Gold.

2021 was also history making in the women’s race. Courtney Hancock who had previously won the Coolangatta Gold three times, won in 2021 making her the only female to win the race four times. Courtney Hancock’s win firmly cemented her title as the Queen of Surf Sports making her the greatest Ironwoman of all time.

In the Uncle Toby's Super Series, a similar version of the race was held, called The Gold Coast Gold. While not officially recognised as the same race, The Gold Coast Gold was essentially the same race, and utilised a similar course to that used today. It was the first event of the new breakaway series in November 1989, and was won by Guy Leech, who extended his unbeaten record. In 1991, Jonathon Crowe after breaking away in the swim, just held on in the final run leg. In 1995, Scott Reeves won, and became the last man to win the Gold Coast Gold

=== Men ===
| Year | Winner | Second | Third | Racetime | Notes |
|---|---|---|---|---|---|
| 2026 | Matt Bevilacqua | Sean Riley | Cory Taylor | 2:22:16 | |
| 2025 | Ali Day | Matt Bevilacqua | Cory Taylor | 2:23:39 | |
| 2024 | Ali Day | Matt Bevilacqua | Jackson Borg | 3:59:31 | |
| 2023 | Ali Day | Matt Bevilacqua | Cory Taylor | 4:03:48 | |
| 2022 | Ali Day | Matt Bevilacqua | Joe Collins | 3:57:49 | |
| 2021 | Ali Day | Cory Taylor | Matt Bevilacqua | 3:52:12 | |
| 2019 | Matt Bevilacqua | Matt Poole | James Lacy | 4:06:19 | |
| 2018 | Ali Day | Max Beattie | Mitch Allum | 4:01.00 | |
| 2017 | Ali Day | Shannon Eckstein | Cory Taylor | 3:52.15 | |
| 2016 | Ali Day | Matt Bevilacqua | Alex Wright | 3:59:30 | |
| 2015 | Ali Day | Nathan Smith | Jeremy Cotter | 3:42:04 | |
| 2014 | Josh Minogue | Jake Nicholson | Sam Bull | 4:12:11 | |
| 2013 | Ali Day | Nathan Smith | Josh Minogue | 3:54.40 | |
| 2012 | Ali Day | Alex Tibbits | Josh Minogue | 3:47:25 | |
| 2011 | Caine Eckstein | Nathan Smith | Alex Tibbets | 4:15:26 | |
| 2010 | Caine Eckstein | Cory Hill | Josh Minogue | 4:11:41 | |
| 2009 | Caine Eckstein | Dean Mercer | Nathan Smith | 4:00:51 | |
| 2008 | Caine Eckstein | Tim Peach | Nathan Smith | 4:14:15 | |
| 2007 | Rhys Drury | Shannon Eckstein | Drew Cairncross | 4:10:58 | |
| 2006 | Zane Holmes | Nathan Smith | Dean Mercer | 4:25:01 | |
| 2005 | Caine Eckstein | Jeremy Cotter | Shannon Eckstein | 4:20:14 | |
| 1992 | Darren Mercer | Michael King | Dean Mercer | | |
| 1991 | Michael King | Darren Mercer | David Kissane | | |
| 1985 | Guy Leech | Stephen McBean | Gray Parkes | | |
| 1984 | Guy Leech | Lawrence Reece | Craig Riddington | | |

=== Women ===
| Year | Winner | Second | Third | Racetime | Notes |
|---|---|---|---|---|---|
| 2026 | Electra Outram | Charlotte Hart | Emily Doyle | 2:47:02 | |
| 2025 | Electra Outram | Carla Papac | Dominique Stitt | 2:40:56 | |
| 2024 | Jemma Smith | Lucy Derbyshire | Tiarnee Massie | 4:21:52 | |
| 2023 | Lana Rogers | Courtney Hancock | Lucy Derbyshire | 4:29:46 | |
| 2022 | Carla Papac | Courtney Hancock | Lana Rogers | 4:27:00 | |
| 2021 | Courtney Hancock | Danielle Mackenzie | Georgia Miller | 4:22:43 | |
| 2019 | Lana Rogers | Jemma Smith | Courtney Hancock | 4:27.51 | |
| 2018 | Georgia Miller | Danielle McKenzie | Lana Rogers | 4:29.22 | |
| 2017 | Courtney Hancock | Allie Britton | Danielle McKenzie | 4:22.54 | |
| 2016 | Courtney Hancock | Allie Britton | Rebecca Creedy | 4:29.08 | |
| 2015 | Elizabeth Pluimers | Brodie Moir | Rebecca Creedy | | |
| 2014 | Elizabeth Pluimers | Rebecca Creedy | Naantali Marshall | | |
| 2013 | Elizabeth Pluimers | Brodie Moir | Courtney Hancock | 4:19.39 | |
| 2012 | Brodie Moir | Courtney Hancock | Bonnie Hancock | 2:58.13 | |
| 2011 | Courtney Hancock | Elizabeth Pluimers | Australia | - | |
| 2010 | Alicia Marriott | Courtney Hancock | Elizabeth Pluimers | - | |
| 2009 | Alicia Marriott | Hayley Bateup | Courtney Hancock | 3hrs:15.39 | |
| 2008 | Hayley Bateup | Courtney Hancock | Alyce Bennett | 3hrs:18:45 | |
| 2007 | Alicia Marriott | Elizabeth Pluimers | Hayley Bateup | 3hrs.22.33 | |
| 2006 | Hayley Bateup | Kristy Harris | Elizabeth Pluimers | 3hrs:17:13 | |
| 2005 | Hayley Bateup | Alicia Marriott | Elizabeth Pluimers | | |

=== Gold Coast Gold Results ===
| Year | Winner | Second | Third |
|---|---|---|---|
| 1989 | Guy Leech | Craig Riddington | Trevor Hendy |
| 1991 | Jonathan Crowe | Murray Cox | Jon Robinson |
| 1995 | Scott Reeves | Jonathan Crowe | Michael King |

== The Course ==
The course for the 1984 and 85 events were as follows: An 11 kilometres (6.8 mi) run from Surfers Paradise, over Burliegh Heads to Tallebudegra Creek, a wade across the creek, a short run to the ocean followed by a 4 kilometres (2.5 mi) swim towards Currumbin, a transition to the board leg at Bilinga, which then took the competitors down to Coolangatta beach, where they turned north and paddled a ski all the way back to Surfers Paradise.

For The Gold Coast Gold, the course was essentially reversed, with a ski leg from Surfers Paradise to Coolangatta, followed by a board to Tugun, a short run into the Currumbin Alley, a swim, a run and then another swim along Palm Beach and around Burleigh Heads, before the final 10 kilometres (6.2 mi) run to Surfers Paradise.

For the reintroduction of the race in 2005, the course was re-modified again. The 2006 course was as follows:

| Leg | Discipline | Route | Distance |
| 1 | Surfski | Surfers Paradise to Greenmount SLSC | 23 kilometres (14 mi) |
| 2 | Run | Greenmount SLSC to Coolangatta SLSC | 0.65 kilometres (0.40 mi) |
| 3 | Swim | Coolangatta SLSC to Bilinga SLSC | 3.50 kilometres (2.17 mi) |
| 4 | Run | Bilinga SLSC to Currumbin SLSC | 4.00 kilometres (2.49 mi) |
| 5 | Board | Currumbin SLSC to Burleigh Heads SLSC | 5.50 kilometres (3.42 mi) |
| 6 | Run | Burleigh Heads SLSC to Surfers Paradise | 10.00 kilometres (6.21 mi) |
| | | | Total 46.65 kilometres (28.99 mi) |

The race has used this format ever since, although since 2010, it has started and finished at Kurrawa beach, and as such, the Ski and Run legs now include a loop up to Northcliffe surf club and then back down to Kurrawa.
