= Jett Kenny =

Australian ironman and model

- Born: 1994 (age 31–32)
- Occupations: Ironman, model, TV personality
- Parents: Grant Kenny (father); Lisa Curry (mother)

Jett Kenny (born 1994) is an Australian ironman, model and television personality.

Ironman Australia and Kona, Hawaii 2026

== Athletic career ==
The son of ironman Grant Kenny and competitive swimmer Lisa Curry, Kenny has competed in professional surf lifesaving competitions since the age of six.

== Entertainment career ==
In 2016, Kenny was signed to Vivien's Models.

In 2018, Kenny competed in the Nine Network's Australian Ninja Warrior and was one of eight celebrities to appear on the Seven Network's The Real Full Monty.

In 2019, Kenny competed in Network Ten's Dancing with the Stars, where he placed fourth.

It was announced in 2021 that Kenny would be part of the SAS Australia TV show.

In 2023, Kenny was reported to take part in the Network Ten's revival of Australian Gladiators as one of the Gladiators. His stage name is "Viking".

== Personal life ==
Kenny prompted some public debate about parental discipline in 2018 after posting a video to his Instagram account of a misbehaving child in a doctor's waiting room with the caption "give your kid a goddam smack". Media commentator Jane Caro criticised Kenny's attitude and said that parents already have a tough job without receiving gratuitous advice from strangers.
