= Thirroul Railway Depot =

Former railway depot in New South Wales, Australia

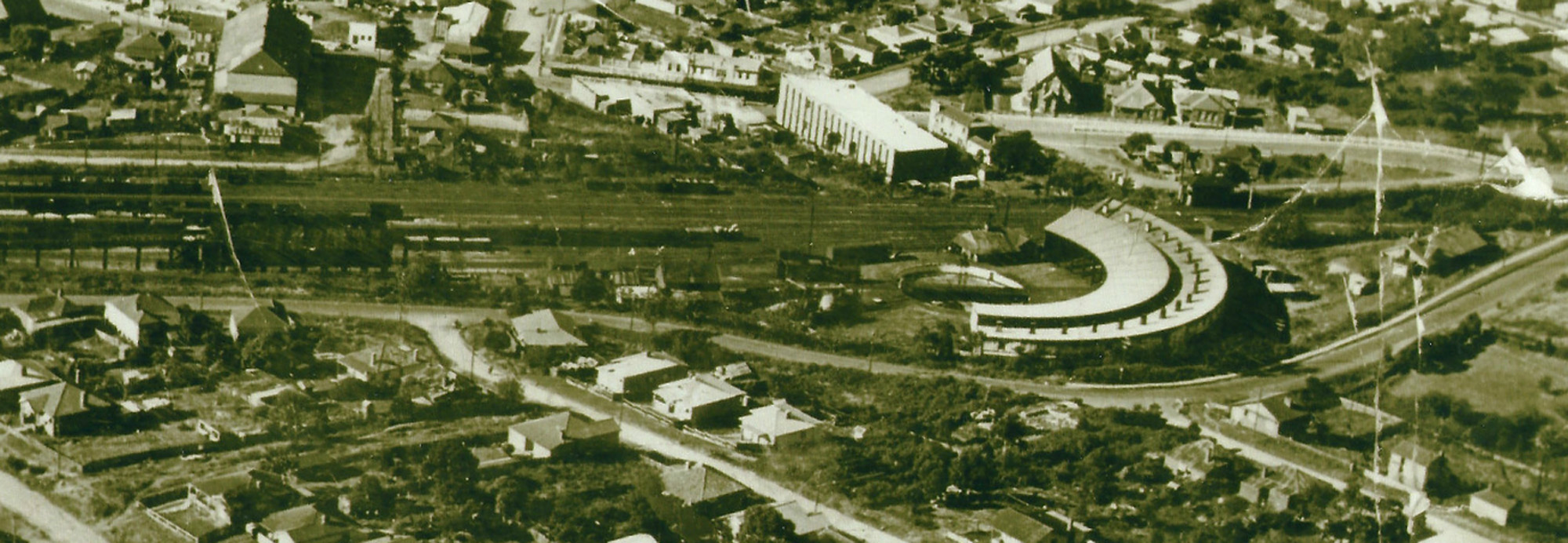
- Thirroul Railway Depot in 1948
- Interactive map of Thirroul Railway Depot

Location
- Location: Illawarra
- Coordinates: 34°18′56″S 150°55′13″E

The Thirroul Railway Depot, at Thirroul, New South Wales, opened in about 1917 and closed in April 1965. During that time it was a major servicing destination for the steam locomotives that ran on the Illawarra Line. The depot was located a little north of Thirroul station and was bounded by Church Street and the lower part of Sea Foam Avenue. After its closure most of the buildings and structures were removed. Only the crew barracks remain on the site at the corner of Church Street and Lawrence Hargrave Drive. The depot area is still owned by the Transport Asset Holding Entity and is used as a storage facility. Since 1998, the barracks have been rented by artists, firstly Barracks Artists Incorporated and then from December 2012 Barracks Art Studios Thirroul Incorporated.

== Overview ==
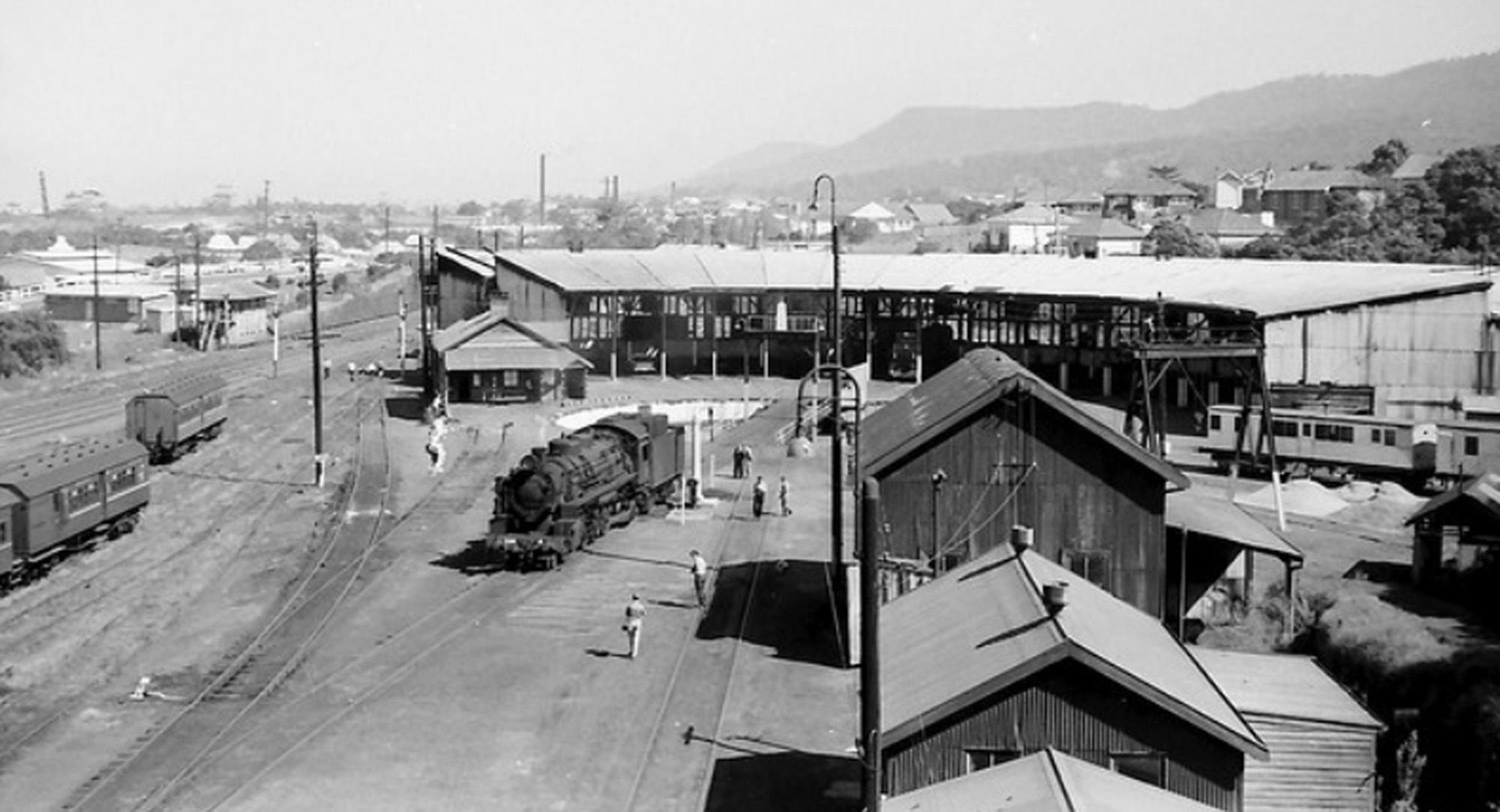
Thirroul Railway Depot showing the roundhouse in the background, the general office is to the left of the roundhouse

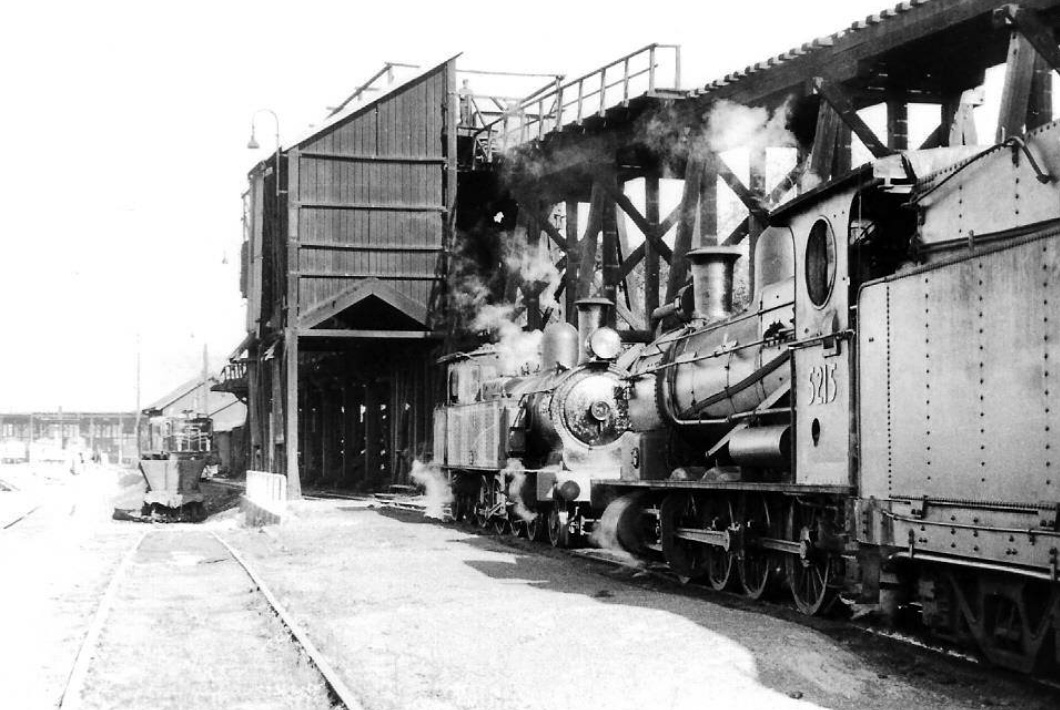
Thirroul Railway Depot showing the elevated coal stage, the roundhouse can be seen on the extreme left

Thirroul was one of the major depots that were built by the NSW Railway Department. At one time it employed about 450 men. It consisted of a roundhouse engine shed capable of accommodating eighteen engines, a 90 ft. turntable, a general office, machine shops, ash pits and an elevated coal stage where coal and water for the engines were dispensed.

The barracks for railway employees were also located on the depot site. These were behind the roundhouse and are shown in the top photo as the long rectangular building on the extreme right. They consist of a series of rooms with no internal access between the rooms with shared bathrooms at the northern end. There is also a kitchen and dining room. There are no chimneys in the building which means that there were no fires to keep the occupants warm. Many former employees remember railway barracks (in general) as being very uncomfortable because they were either too hot or too cold. Some recall having to wrap clothing around their feet to keep warm at night.

One notable employee at the Thirroul Depot in its early days was Harry Starling. He was the roundhouse chargeman who was employed in this position between 1918 and 1934. Harry commenced his career in the NSW Railways as a cleaner and worked his way up to be an engine driver. However, in 1914 he was badly injured while driving a steam train when the gauge glass of the engine burst and he lost the sight of one eye. He lived in Bulli after he commenced duties in the Thirroul Depot and was a widely respected member of this community.

Another employee attached to the Thirroul Depot was Bill Woodward. He worked as a guard on the steam trains for many years. He became Vice President of the Australian Railways Union and was a prominent member of the Thirroul Labor Branch. He was a very respected citizen and a park in the town of Thirroul is named after him.

John Symons was for a very long period based at the Thirroul depot. He worked his way up to become an engine driver. In 1937 he had an unfortunate experience at a level crossing when the train hit a pedestrian on the track.

== History ==
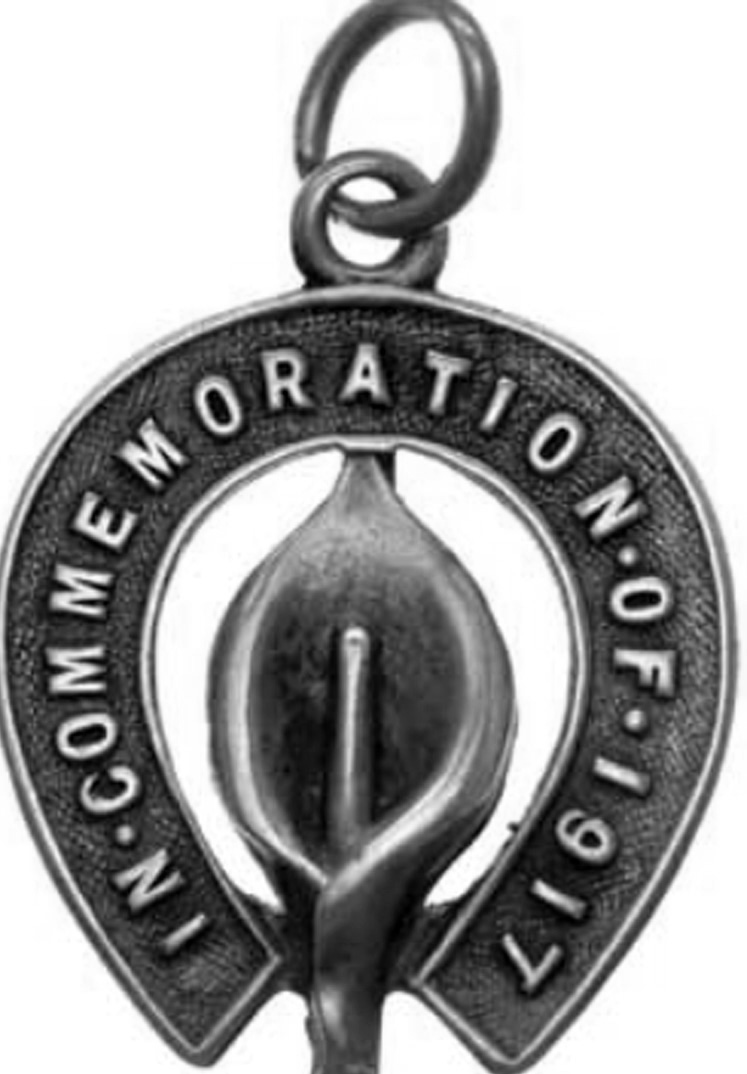
The Lily White medal which was given to railway men who participated in the 1917 strike.

Almost immediately after the Depot opened in 1917 the men employed there were plunged into the turmoil of the famous General Strike. The strike began at the Sydney Railway Depots and spread through the other areas. A telegram was sent to the Thirroul Depot saying "All loco men cease work forthwith." Two days later other telegrams were sent. One read "All unions have called general strike on railways. All out here". Some obeyed these orders and some continued to work. After the strike was over those that did stop work were severely punished. Many of them were sacked. One newspaper reported:

"Although practically the whole of the railway employees declared willingness to resume at the Thirroul depot only three sets of locomotive men and a few mechanics are employed. A number of the former employees of the Railway Department have been informed that their services are no longer required."

Some were subsequently reinstated but strict conditions were imposed and many were demoted. Those that had participated in the strike formed the Lily White Association and produced the medal which is shown on the right. A railway man who was familiar with the history of this Association said that the men at Thirroul wore it on their watch chains in defiance of railway officials. He said that at the side of the up-line, someone carved the lily into the rock face so that all could see it and remember.

There were many types of employees at the depot. They included the engine drivers, firemen, cleaners, maintenance workers and general clerks. There was a strict line of advancement to become an engine driver within the NSW railways. The first stage was to be a locomotive cleaner and many commenced this occupation in their late teens or early twenties. The job of the cleaner was to ensure that the grime that accumulated on the engine parts was removed so that the train could run smoothly. There were usually four cleaners assigned to each locomotive. Two cleaned the boiler brasses, the buffer and the driving wheels. The other two cleaned the wheels, the coupling rods and the framing. One elderly man who remembered his time as a cleaner said:

"The unpainted steel was rubbed with emery paper and then smeared with vaseline. Sponges were used instead of emery paper in cleaning the painted portions. The worst part was cleaning out the impurities which accumulated in the boiler; to do this a cleaner had to get inside it. Repetitive as the work was, cleaning was essential to the running of the engines. Dirt and grime built up quickly on their moving parts. The axle boxes, cranks, motion bars and eccentrics were most vulnerable. An engine which was not properly looked after soon needed costly repairs."

After being a cleaner for some years it was usual to become a fireman who was responsible for maintaining the working of the furnace to power the locomotive. When this part of the promotion process was completed, the employee was eligible to become an engine driver.

== Hazards of railway work ==
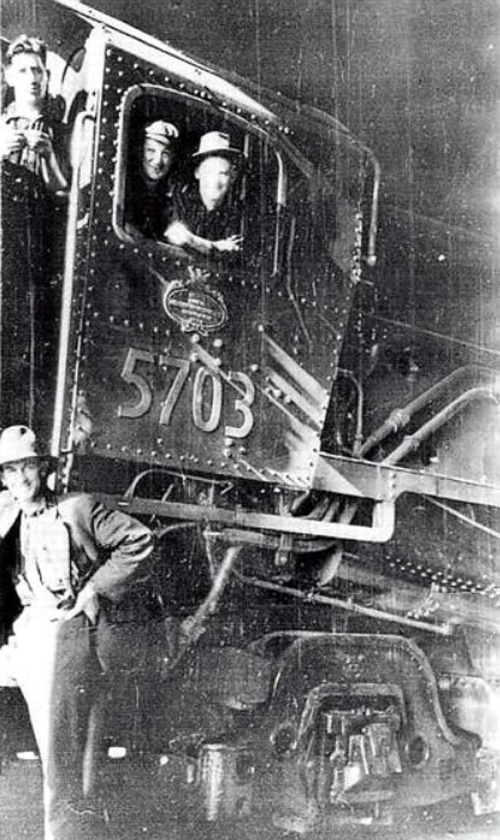
Railway men who worked at the Thirroul Railway Depot in the 1930s.

At the beginning of the 20th century, railway employment was dangerous. Employees of the Thirroul Depot were often involved in serious accidents during their work shifts. The most vulnerable workers were the shunters in the yard. Several accidents were reported in the newspapers about these men. In 1919 soon after the Depot opened Alan McLaren a junior shunter aged only 19 lost his leg in the yard when he was run over by a coal hopper. His case illustrates the lack of adequate compensation measures that existed for employees at that time in all occupations (not just the railways). It took him nearly twenty years to obtain four hundred pounds from the Railway Department for the loss of his leg.

In 1926 25-year-old John Luther Rooke was knocked down while engaged in his shunting duties at the Depot and later died in Bulli Hospital. In 1933 James Barbour Pollock a shunter at the depot tripped while he was shunting trucks and his left leg was crushed. It was subsequently amputated below the knee. He continued to work for the railways in Thirroul until his death in 1959. He is buried in Bulli Cemetery.

The train crews who were based at the Depot also suffered injuries. The firemen were often in danger when they climbed down from the engine to manually alter the tracks. In 1918 John Kerr Cummins, then a 34-year-old fireman stationed at Thirroul was injured when he was operating the turntable for his train at Macdonaldtown in Sydney. He fractured his skull when part of the mechanism struck him on the temple. John and his wife Ivy remained in Thirroul after the accident and John later became an engine driver. He died there in 1952 at the age of sixty eight and is buried at Bulli cemetery.

In 1938 Walter Eric Moore, a fireman attached to the Depot was killed when he was caught between the buffers of trucks near Bombo. He had disembarked from his train in order to adjust the air brakes when the accident occurred. Walter was a very long term resident of Thirroul. He had lived in "Fairfield" Main South Coast Road when he had enlisted twenty years earlier to fight in World War I. He later moved with his wife to Bath Street. After his death in 1938 his widow Thelma remained at Thirroul and later moved to Sydney. In 1940 Roy Davidson, a fireman attached to the Thirroul Depot was struck by another engine when changing points for his own train. His leg was severely injured. In 1951 John Hay, a guard, was killed instantly when a runaway steam engine struck him at Unanderra siding.

== Closure of the depot ==
In the late 1950s the steam trains were beginning to become obsolete as the new diesel-electric locomotive was introduced. In 1957 Ralph Marsh of the Labour Council said:

"The railway depots would close because diesel engines did not require re fuelling and watering facilities or anything like the same maintenance as steam trains and some diesel engines could run for 10 days without maintenance... It seemed inevitable that service and maintenance depots such as Taree and Thirroul would eventually close."

In April 1965 his warning proved to be correct as the Thirroul depot closed and its buildings were dismantled.
