= Caine Eckstein =

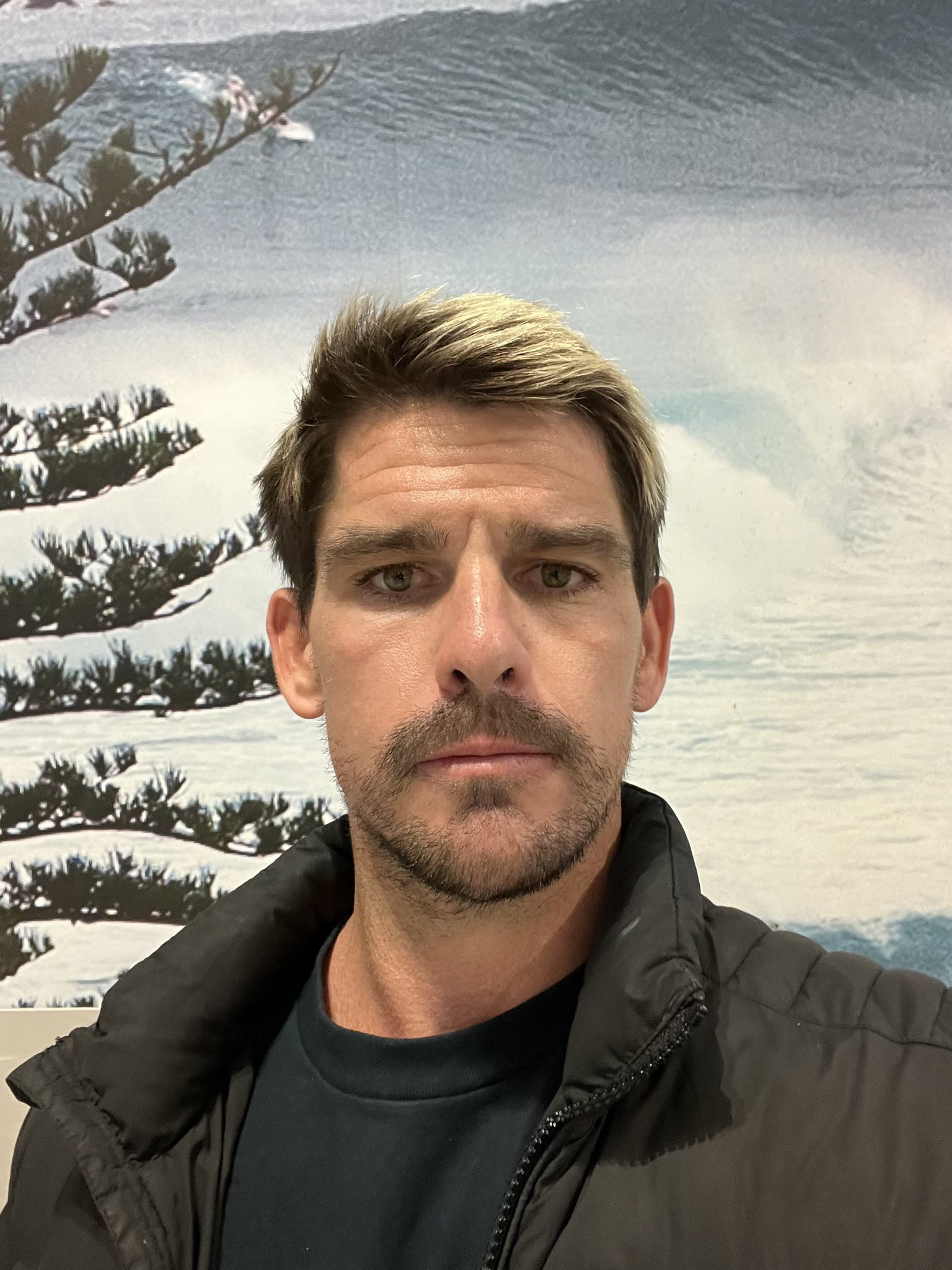
- Born: 16 November 1985 (age 40); Gold Coast, Australia

Caine Eckstein (born 16 November 1985) is an Australian Ironman surf lifesaving champion with his brother Shannon Eckstein.

== Career ==
In 2014, Eckstein broke the Guinness World Record for most pull-ups in 24 hours, completing 4,210 pull-ups. After subsequently losing the record, in 2016 he regained it after completing 7,620.

In 2022, Eckstein won a fourth title The Coolangatta Gold. Later that year, on 5 June 2022, Eckstein achieved the most pull ups (1131) in one hour by a male at the Gold Coast, Queensland, Australia.

On 13 August 2022 at Pacific Fair shopping centre, Eckstein again set the Guinness World record for most pull-ups in 8hrs to 4710.
