= Hayley Bateup =

Australian ironwoman

Hayley Bateup is an Australian professional ironwoman, surf life saver and fire fighter. She won the Coolangatta Gold three times.

== Career ==
She joined the Nippers when she was 12. She qualified for her first Ironwoman competition when she was 16.

In 1998, Bateup won the Under 18 Ironwoman and Board Championships at the Australian Surf Life Saving Championships at Kurrawa, and won both titles again in 2001. In 2001, Bateup won the open Ironwoman.

At the Australian Surf Life Saving Championships at Kurrawa, she won three silver medals in 2002. In 2003, she won two gold meals and two silver medals. She was Australian board champion in 2001, 2003, 2005, and 2009.

In 2003, Bateup competed with three teammates to paddle from Florida to Cuba. The 112-mile crossing on paddleboards took the team 25 hours and 44 minutes.

Bateup appeared on the 2008 series of Australian Gladiators as 'Nitro'.

She won her final Coolangatta Gold title in 2008, but was unable to compete in 2010 and during the 2010-2011 ironwoman season due shoulder and bicep surgery. Bateup advocated to make the distance and prize money for women in the Coolangatta Gold the same as the men's. Bateup stopped competing as a professional athlete in 2012.

In 2012, she began Hayley Bateup's Body Blitz, a personal training business, with April Zekulich. Bateup competed in the GC Celebrity Pro-Am in 2019. In 2016, Bateup completed training with the Queensland Fire and Emergency Services and was posted as a firefighter to Southport.

== Personal life ==
Bateup and Zekulich married in 2019. They have two sons and live in Currumbin.
