= Trevor Hendy =

Australian surf lifesaver

Trevor Ronald Hendy, AM (born 7 August 1968) is a former Australian professional surf lifesaver.

Trevor Hendy and Guy Leech during the 1993/94 series.

Throughout the late 1980s and early 1990s, Hendy competed in Ironman (surf lifesaving) races, winning the Australian Championship six times and coming second on three occasions. Trevor was also a superb Malibu board paddler, winning multiple Australian Championships. He also won the Uncle Toby's Super Series four times. He was made a Member of the Order of Australia in 1996 for services to surf lifesaving, and is a member of the Australian, Queensland, Gold Coast and Australian Surf Lifesaving Halls of Fame.

Trevor Hendy was married to Miss Surf Girl Jacki Dann (Hendy) in 1988. They have two children together, daughter Kristelle and son TJ (Trevor Jack). Jacki and Trevor divorced in 1995 but still remain very close friends. Trevor later remarried to Jo Macdermid (Hendy) and they have two children, son Bailey and daughter Jaali.

Later in his career, Hendy switched to kayak paddling, where he made the Australian Kayaking team in 1998 for the World Championships and World Cup season. After a successful European summer, in which he medalled as a part of Australia's K41000m combination, Hendy returned home and announced his retirement, ending his bid for a place in the 2000 Olympics. Despite retiring professionally and no longer training{fact}, he went on to win Australian Championships into the early 2000s.

Hendy then went into motivational speaking and life coaching. He launched www.trevorhendy.com in late August 2012.

Hendy was inducted into the Sport Australia Hall of Fame in 2000. He also received an Australian Sports Medal in that year.
