= Ky Hurst =

Australian swimmer

Personal information
- Full name: Ky Hurst
- Nickname: "Killer"
- National team: Australia
- Born: 11 March 1981 (age 45) Nambour, Queensland, Australia
- Height: 1.96 m (6 ft 5 in)
- Weight: 92 kg (203 lb)

Sport
- Sport: Swimming
- Strokes: Freestyle
- Club: Mermaid Beach AEME Surf Life Saving Club
Medal record
Men's swimming
Representing Australia
World Championships
Silver medal – second place	2011 Shanghai	5 km team
Silver medal – second place	1998 Perth	5km open water

Ky Hurst (born 11 March 1981) is an Australian swimmer and ironman. He competed at the 2008 Summer Olympics in the 10km marathon swimming event and finished in 11th place, after qualifying by finishing fifth at the 2008 FINA World Open Water Swimming Championship. Hurst was one of the first Australian athletes to gain selection for the 2012 London Olympics by placing fifth at the 2011 World Open Water Swimming Championships. At that time Hurst decided to continue to pursue both swimming and Ironman racing during 2012, the latter he competed in with great success. Hurst was a long term ward of master coach Dennis Cottrell, at the Miami Club. He is now under noted swimmer and coach Colin Braund and in Bond Club.

He won a silver medal at the 1998 World Aquatics Championships in the 5km Open Water swimming event. He failed to qualify for the 1500m freestyle event at the 2004 Summer Olympics placing 3rd.

In ironman competitions, Hurst has won four Australian Ironman titles, and is a member of the Surf Life Saving Australia Hall of Fame. After the 2014 Australian Surf Lifesaving championships, Hurst won his tenth Open Men's Surf title from eleven starts, solidifying in many experts mind that he is the greatest surf swimmer the sport of Surf Lifesaving has ever produced. Added to this is the fact that he was undefeated from four starts in age races. As of 2014 Hurst hold the record for the most open age individual titles at the Australian Surf Lifesaving titles at 14, including his ten surf and four ironman titles. He became a grinder for the America's Cup Challenge, Oracle Team USA in their campaign for the 35th America's Cup.

Hurst is one of Surf Lifesaving's greatest all-round competitors, having won Australian championships in ironman, surf, board rescue, surf team and taplin relay.

Hurst attended Bond University on a sporting scholarship and studied property development and business. He also competed in the third season of the television series Dancing with the Stars.
