= Dean Mercer =

Australian sportsman

Dean Mercer OAM
Personal information
- Full name: Dean Paul Mercer
- Nationality: Australian
- Born: 24 November 1969 Bulli, New South Wales, Australia
- Died: 28 August 2017 (aged 47) Gold Coast, Queensland, Australia

Sport
- Country: Australia
- Sport: Ironman surf lifesaving

Dean Paul Mercer OAM (24 November 1969 – 28 August 2017) was an Australian sportsman who competed in ironman events.

== Career ==
Mercer was born in Bulli and raised in Thirroul, both suburbs of Wollongong. Early in his career, Mercer and his brother Darren were coached by their father, John. Mercer became a professional ironman at 15 and competed from 1987 to 2010. He won the Australian open ironman titles in 1989 and 1995, and five New South Wales championships. In 1997 he won the World Oceanman series. He competed in his last Coolangatta Gold aged 40.

In 1992, Mercer was awarded the Medal of the Order of Australia (OAM) for "service to surf lifesaving", and in 1990 was inducted into the NSW Hall of Champions at Sydney Olympic Park.

At the time of his death Mercer was director of surf sports, and nippers coach, at Kurrawa Surf Club at Broadbeach, Queensland a position he held since October 2014.

== Private life ==
Born on 24 November 1969 to Maureen and John Mercer, Mercer grew up in Thirroul, New South Wales.

Mercer married Kaylene Costello in 1998.

In 2003, he married Reen Corbett, an ironwoman competitor in her own right. They later had four boys.

In 2013, a magistrates court ordered Mercer to repay almost $700 after stealing bedsheets from a department store. No conviction was recorded.

Mercer died after suffering a cardiac arrest while driving at Mermaid Waters on 28 August 2017.
