= Grant Kenny =

Australian canoeist and surf lifesaver

Personal information
- Full name: Grant Hayden Kenny
- Nationality: Australian
- Born: 14 June 1963 (age 63) Maryborough, Queensland, Australia

Sport
- Country: Australia
- Sport: Canoe sprint, Ironman surf lifesaving
Medal record
Men's canoe sprint
Olympic Games
Bronze medal – third place	1984 Los Angeles	K-2 1000 m

Grant Hayden Kenny OAM (born 14 June 1963) is an Australian former Ironman, surf lifesaver and canoeist. He won a bronze medal in the K-2 1000m event at the 1984 Summer Olympics.

== Career ==
Kenny made headlines in 1980 when, as a 16-year-old, he won both the Australian Junior and Open Iron Man Championship on the same day. Kenny then won the Australian Open Ironman Title for the following three years. He also became a household name in Australia due to his sponsorship deals with Kelloggs Nutri-Grain, and appeared in television commercials for the cereal.

After turning his attention to kayaks in the mid-1980s, Kenny later became an important figure in creating the Uncle Toby's Super Series, which was a ground-breaking professional Iron Man circuit that lasted for 12 years. Kenny was also a competitor in the first two seasons, but by 1989 his other interests had taken away the necessary time to train for such a demanding sport and his results were never anything like his domination during his late teens.

In kayaks, Kenny competed in two Summer Olympics. He won a bronze medal in the K-2 1000 m event with Barry Kelly at Los Angeles in 1984.

== Honours ==
Kenny is a recipient of the Medal of the Order of Australia, which he received in 1986 for his service to sport. He has also been awarded the Australian Sports Medal in 2000, and the Centenary Medal in 2001, both for his services to the sporting and business world. He was also inducted into the Sport Australia Hall of Fame in 1996.

== Personal life ==
Kenny was married to the Australian Commonwealth swimming champion Lisa Curry in 1986. They had three children, (Jaimi, Morgan and Jett) Kenny and his former wife co-owned the Curry Kenny Aviation Group, which in 2009 owned approximately 60 aircraft. In May 2009, it was reported that Kenny and Curry had separated.

On 17 December 2012, it was reported that he and comedian Fifi Box were expecting a child. This was later confirmed, and on 5 April 2013 a daughter was born.
