= Shannon Eckstein =

Australian surf lifesaver

Medal record

Men's lifesaving

Representing Australia

The World Games
Gold medal – first place	2009 Kaohsiung	Ironman
Bronze medal – third place	2009 Kaohsiung	Board race

Shannon Eckstein (born 1983) is an Australian Ironman surf lifesaving champion with his brother Caine Eckstein.

Shannon is regarded as the greatest surf lifesaving ironman in history winning 8 Australian ironman titles, 6 world ironman titles and 9 Nutri-Grain series titles (with over 40 individual race wins).

Shannon Eckstein won the junior and senior ironman races at the Queensland championships in 2002 at 19 years old.

He retired in 2019.

He is married and a father of two. He works part-time for a property development company.

In 2026, he was inducted into the Sport Australia Hall of Fame as an athlete member.
