= Ironman (surf lifesaving) =

Discipline of surf lifesaving

The sport of Ironman was developed in 1964 in Australia by Valentine Trainor to combine the four main disciplines of surf lifesaving into a single race; swimming, board paddling, ski paddling and running. The sport should not be confused with Ironman triathlon. It is typically run as a single event as a part of a surf life saving carnival, although it can be run as a sport in its own right. Internationally it is sometimes called Oceanman.

== History ==
After the creation of the Surf Lifesaving movement in 1907, members needed a way to stay fit and hone their skills in between patrols. Thus, in 1915, the first NSW Titles were held. These early titles held traditional events such as the boat race, march past, Rescue & Resuscitation (R&R) and surf races. On a 1964 Australian tour of California, the competitors came across an event known as the 'Taplin', which involved a swim, ski, board legs, with running transitions. This became the ironman race. In 1966, it was first held at the Australian Championships at Coolangatta beach, and was won by Hayden Kenny.

Perhaps the most famous ironman was Grant Kenny, who in 1980 at the age of 16 made the event famous by winning the Australian Junior and Australian Open Ironman championships within the space of half an hour. Grant became a national hero, appearing on cereal boxes and television advertisements, and was seen as the pinnacle of Aussie sportsmen. The short Ironman event became famous and the centre of attention at all surf carnivals.

In the early 1980s a movie was made called The Coolangatta Gold, about an ironman event that required competitors to complete a 42 kilometres (26 mi) course along Queensland's Gold Coast. A circuit was then developed that mixed 10-minute Ironman races with the 'Coolangatta Gold', and a range of other professional Ironman events around Australia.

In 1989 an elite group of Ironmen took the sport one step further and created an ironman event for TV. The event was named the Uncle Toby's Super Series and was initially very successful, but after 10 years of big television ratings, the retirement of a few of the sports biggest start lead to a decline in its popularity in the late 1990s. This led to the end of the Uncle Toby's Super Series in the 2000/2001 season. An attempt to revive the series was made in 2011 with the introduction of Kellogg's Nutri-Grain Ironman Series which was also televised on Network Ten however by 2011 the Australian sporting television landscape had changed, meaning live, free to air sport didn't command the same viewing numbers as the 1990s and therefore didn't support as high a level of commercial support and funding. Whilst those that watched the revived series found it highly entertaining, attracting the required large numbers proved to be an uphill battle.

In 2013, the Kellogg's Ironman series switched to the larger viewing base of Channel 9 and Wide World of Sports. They also reverted to 5 pre-recorded rounds followed by a live final. This was deemed to be a successful transition and at least temporarily breathed life back into the Australian Profession Ironman circuit. It may be a while before the return to the "household name" days of Grant Kenny, Trevor Hendy, Guy Leech and Darren Mercer but has given a new platform to young Ironman stars, Shannon and Caine Eckstein, Ky Hurst, Matt Poole, Matt Bevilacqua, Ali Day and Kendrick Louis.

Shannon Eckstein (known as the "Professor") is widely regarded as the greatest surf ironman in history with eight (8) Australian championships, nine (9) professional series wins and six (6) world iron man championships.

== Races ==
The typical Ironman race consists of a water leg of either swim, ski or board, that lasts about 3–4 minutes, with a course going out through the break, around a set of turning buoys, and back in. It then has a run of about 150m, around two flags on the beach, before the next water leg in a similar fashion to the first. This continues for the third water leg, before a final run to the finish line. The order for each water leg is determined at the start of every carnival by random draw. The distances for each leg vary upon conditions, however they are around 800m for the ski leg, 600m for the board, 400m for the swim and 150m for each run leg.

=== Ski ===
The surf ski is an 18-foot long kayak, that is especially designed for going in and out of the surf. Because of its lack of stability, it can often be the most challenging in rough conditions, however, because it is the fastest, it allows the competitor to be aggressive when it comes to getting out through surf and in chop. The Ski course is around three buoys, set in an apex course.

=== Swim ===
For the swim leg, the competitors are required to swim around the 'string line', a line of 9 coloured buoys. Perhaps the most technically demanding of the legs, because it requires the athlete to swim under waves whilst swimming out to sea, and bodysurfing them on the way back in. Because of the often rough nature of the water, ironmen must be very proficient at swimming. The best swimmers in an ironmen field are often close to Olympic standard, such as Ky Hurst, whilst training for three other disciplines.

=== Board ===
The board leg involves paddling a modified Malibu paddle board around a set of four black-and-white string lines. Going out through the surf can be quite difficult, as athletes must use their weight to 'pop' over each wave. However, on the way in is relatively simple, as the athlete must only prevent the board from nosediving. As such, many big waves can be caught in the board leg.

=== Run ===
A relatively short and easier leg in the ironman race. The run leg involves running from the edge of the surf, around two flags set on the beach, and back out into the surf. Because of this, the surface can change very quickly from wet to hard to soft and back again, so the ironman must change his running technique regularly. In ironman events from the 1970s to the 1990s, the run leg was often managed as a recovery leg between the ocean legs. However in the 2000s Shannon Eckstein weaponised this leg into a truly fourth element of the ironman event by sprinting the run course during each facet of his races.

=== Start ===
As the order of the ironman changes for every race, the start procedure changes for the first leg. For a swim first, the athletes will line up on the sand and run into the water. For board first, they will line up in a similar fashion, but with their boards under their arms. For ski first, they will start on the water's edge, next to their ski, and jump in when the gun fires.

== Major events ==
While ironman races are held at every surf carnival, there are some major events that attract prize money, sponsorship and television coverage.

=== Australian Ironman Championship results ===
Held at the Australian Surf Life Saving Championships every year, the Australian Ironman Title is awarded to the winner at this event. The format is the same as for typical surf carnivals, a ten- to twelve-minute race with a field of sixteen, with the first eight competing in the final. This is the blue ribbon event at the carnival, and it is also the one that attracts the most attention in terms of television coverage and spectators on the beach. It is typically the last event on the program, raced on a Sunday afternoon .

Year	Male Winner	Club	Event Location
1966	Hayden Kenny	Alexandra Headlands	Coolangatta QLD
1967	Barry Rodgers	Maroubra	Southport SA
1968	Barry Rodgers	Maroubra	Nth Cronulla NSW
1969	Barry Rodgers	Maroubra	Clifton TAS
1970	Fred Annesley	Trigg Island	Ocean Grove VIC
1971	Norm Rabjohns	Currumbin	City of Perth WA
1972	Norm Rabjohns	Currumbin	Swansea NSW
1973	Ken Vidler	Scarborough	Burleigh QLD
1974	Simon Martin	Nth Cottesloe	Glenelg SA
1975	Ken Vidler	Scarborough	Dee Why NSW
1976	Ken Vidler	Scarborough	Clifton TAS
1977	John Holt	Cronulla	Bancoora VIC
1978	Robert Chapman	Wanda	Kingscliff NSW
1979	Greg Allum	Wanda	Trigg Island WA
1980	Grant Kenny	Alexandra Headlands	Maroochydore QLD
1981	Grant Kenny	Alexandra Headlands	Wanda NSW
1982	Grant Kenny	Alexandra Headlands	Moana SA
1983	Grant Kenny	Alexandra Headlands	Clifton TAS
1984	Robert Chapman	Wanda	Kurrawa QLD
1985	Dwanye Thuys	Seacliff	Point Leo VIC
1986	Dwanye Thuys	Seacliff	Moana SA
1987	Trevor Hendy	Surfers Paradise	Scarborough WA
1988	Trevor Hendy	Surfers Paradise	Sutherland NSW
1989	Dean Mercer	Thirroul	Burleigh QLD
1990	Trevor Hendy	Surfers Paradise	Nth Wollongong NSW
1991	Trevor Hendy	Surfers Paradise	Scarborough WA
1992	Trevor Hendy	Surfers Paradise	Collaroy NSW
1993	Guy Andrews	Tugun	Kurrawa QLD
1994	Trevor Hendy	Surfers Paradise	Swansea NSW
1995	Dean Mercer	Thirroul	Kurrawa QLD
1996	Darren Mercer	Thirroul	Kurrawa QLD
1997	Darren Mercer	Thirroul	Kurrawa QLD
1998	Steven Pullen	Alexandra Headlands	Kurrawa QLD
1999	Ky Hurst	Nth Burleigh	Kurrawa QLD
2000	Ky Hurst	Tugun	Kurrawa QLD
2001	Ky Hurst	Tugun	Kurrawa QLD
2002	Ky Hurst	Tugun	Kurrawa QLD
2003	Shannon Eckstein	Surfers Paradise	Kurrawa QLD
2004	Zane Holmes	Kawana Waters	Kurrawa QLD
2005	Nathan Smith	Cronulla	Kurrawa QLD
2006	Shannon Eckstein	Northcliffe	Kurrawa QLD
2007	Pierce Leonard	Northcliffe	Scarborough WA
2008	Shannon Eckstein	Northcliffe	Scarborough WA
2009	Pierce Leonard	Northcliffe	Scarborough WA
2010	not contested		Kurrawa QLD
2011	Shannon Eckstein	Northcliffe	Kurrawa QLD
2012	Shannon Eckstein	Northcliffe	North Kirra QLD
2013	Cam Cole	Mooloolaba	North Kirra QLD
2014	Shannon Eckstein	Northcliffe	Scarborough WA
2015	Shannon Eckstein	Northcliffe	North Kirra QLD
2016	Shannon Eckstein	Northcliffe	Maroochydore QLD
2017	not contested		North Kirra QLD
2018	Kendrick Louis	Manly	Scarborough WA
2019	Max Brooks	Newport	Broadbeach QLD
2020	not contested		Broadbeach QLD
2021	Ali Day	Surfers Paradise	Maroochydore QLD
2022	Ali Day	Surfers Paradise	North Kirra QLD
2023	Ali Day	Surfers Paradise	Scarborough WA
2024	Dan Collins	Redhead	Maroochydore QLD
2025	Ali Day	Surfers Paradise	North Kirra QLD
2026	Ethan Callaghan	Burleigh Heads	North Kirra QLD

Year	Female Winner	Club	Event Location
1992	Samantha O'Brien	South Maroubra	Collaroy NSW
1993	Karla Gilbert	Surfers Paradise	Kurrawa QLD
1994	Karla Gilbert	Surfers Paradise	Swansea NSW
1995	Stacy Gartrell	Wanda	Kurrawa QLD
1996	Kirsty Holmes	Alexandra Headland	Kurrawa QLD
1997	Stacy Gartrell	Wanda	Kurrawa QLD
1998	Kerri Thomas	Maroochydore	Kurrawa QLD
1999	Kerri Thomas	Maroochydore	Kurrawa QLD
2000	Kirsty Holmes	Kawana Waters	Kurrawa QLD
2001	Hayley Bateup	Northcliffe	Kurrawa QLD
2002	Kristy Munroe	Alexandra Headland	Kurrawa QLD
2003	Karla Gilbert	Surfers Paradise	Kurrawa QLD
2004	Kristy Cameron	Northcliffe	Kurrawa QLD
2005	Kristyl Smith	Northcliffe	Kurrawa QLD
2006	Naomi Flood	Manly	Kurrawa QLD
2007	Kristy Harris	Northcliffe	Scarborough WA
2008	Alicia Marriott	City of Perth	Scarborough WA
2009	Kristyl Smith	Northcliffe	Scarborough WA
2010	not contested		Kurrawa QLD
2011	Courtney Hancock	Northcliffe	Kurrawa QLD
2012	Rebecca Creedy	Met Caloundra	North Kirra QLD
2013	Courtney Hancock	Northcliffe	North Kirra QLD
2014	Elizabeth Pluimers	Nth Burleigh	Scarborough WA
2015	Elizabeth Pluimers	Nth Burleigh	North Kirra QLD
2016	Rebecca Creedy	Northcliffe	Maroochydore QLD
2017	not contested		North Kirra QLD
2018	Lana Rogers	Noosa Heads	Scarborough WA
2019	Georgia Miller	Northcliffe	Broadbeach QLD
2020	not contested		Broadbeach QLD
2021	Georgia Miller	Northcliffe	Maroochydore QLD
2022	Georgia Miller	Northcliffe	North Kirra QLD
2023	Naomi Scott	Northcliffe	Scarborough WA
2024	Lana Rogers	Northcliffe	Maroochydore QLD
2025	Georgia Miller	Northcliffe	North Kirra QLD
2026	Tiarnee Massie	Maroochydore	North Kirra QLD

=== World Championship ===
Held at the World titles every two years. Carries none of the prestige of an Australian Championship, the field at the beginning of the carnival is usually smaller, and is not raced in as tricky conditions. The World Ironman Champion is decided from the results of the World Interclub Championships.

Year	Winner	Location
1981	Mark Bennetts	Bali
1983	Dwayne Thuyus	Hawaii
1988	Trevor Hendy	Southport, Australia
1990	Trevor Hendy	Lubeck, Germany
1992	Trevor Hendy	Shimoda, Japan
1994	Trevor Hendy	Newquay, England
1996	Nathan Meyer	Durban, South Africa
1998	Nathan Meyer	Auckland, New Zealand
2000	Phil Clayton	Manly, Australia
2002	Shannon Eckstein	Orlando, USA
2004	Zane Holmes	Viareggio, Italy
2006	Zane Holmes	Lorne, Australia
2008	Shannon Eckstein	Berlin, Germany
2010	Shannon Eckstein	Alexandria, Egypt
2012	Shannon Eckstein	Adelaide, Australia
2014	Shannon Eckstein	Montepelier, France
2016	Shannon Eckstein	Netherlands
2018	Ali Day	Adelaide, Australia
2020	not contested	
2022	not contested	Riccione, Italy
2024	Finn Askew	Kurrawa, Australia

Year	Winner	Location
1998	Karla Gilbert	Auckland, New Zealand
2000	Karla Gilbert	Manly, Australia
2002	Kirsty Munroe	Orlando, USA
2004	Kirsty Munroe	Viareggio, Italy
2006	Kirsty Munroe	Lorne, Australia
2008	Naomi Flood	Berlin, Germany
2010	Kristyl Smith	Alexandria, Egypt
2012	Brodie Moir	Adelaide, Australia
2014	Kristyl Smith	Montepelier, France
2016	Harriet Brown	Netherlands
2018	Karlee Nurthen	Adelaide, Australia
2020	not contested	
2022	not contested	Riccione, Italy
2024	Naomi Scott	Kurrawa, Australia

=== The Coolangatta Gold ===
The Coolangatta Gold is a ultra-endurance marathon from Surfer's Paradise to Coolangatta and back, hosted by Surf Life Saving Australia.

=== The Ironman Series ===
First known as the Kellogg's Nutri-Grain Grand Prix in 1986, before the creation of the Uncle Toby's Super Series in 1989, and then the Kellogg's Nutri-Grain Ironman Series in 2002. The Ironman Series has always involved a variety of formats and locations, making it tough for any one athlete to dominate. The Series over the years has given a much greater profile to the sport and its athletes, and has allowed many athletes to become semi-professional.
