= Australia's Greatest Athlete season 3 =

Australia's Greatest Athlete
- Season 3
- No. of episodes: 6

Release
- Original network: Seven Network
- Original release: 13 February – 20 March 2011

Season chronology
- ← Previous; Season 2

The third season of Australia's Greatest Athlete was broadcast on the Seven Network and was hosted by Mark Beretta, with last season's competitor Wendell Sailor. Mark Webber and past season winner Billy Slater presented occasional fitness tips and interviews with the competitors in video packages.

Billy Slater, who won the first two seasons of the show, did not defend his title due to recovery from shoulder surgery, but was still involved in the show as a 'Rexona ambassador' alongside Mark Webber, where each also tips a player in each event. This season was filmed at the Novotel Twin Waters Resort on the Sunshine Coast in Queensland.

The season began on 13 February 2011 at 4:30pm for a total of six episodes.

== Participants ==
- Shannon Eckstein - Three-time world Ironman champion and runner up of season 2
- Mark Winterbottom - V8 Supercar driver
- Quade Cooper - Rugby Union player
- Luke Hodge - Australian rules football player
- Kurt Gidley - Rugby league 4-time defending champion
- Eamon Sullivan - Olympic swimmer
- Fabrice Lapierre - athletics competitor (long jump)
- Ken Wallace - Olympic Kayaking competitor

== Episodes ==
=== Episode 1 ===
- Mini Ironman Challenge
- Rugby Oz Tag Challenge

=== Episode 2 ===
- Swimming Challenge
- Bench Press Challenge

=== Episode 3 ===
- Jet Ski Challenge
- 40m Beach Sprint Challenge

=== Episode 4 ===
- Surf Boat Rowing Challenge
- AFL Kick For Goal Challenge

=== Episode 5 ===
- Basketball Challenge
- Boxing Challenge

=== Episode 6 ===
- Final Assault Course

== Results table ==
The following table shows how many points each competitor earned throughout the series.

Competitor	Challenge											
	1	2	3	4	5	6	7	8	9	10	11	Total
	Mini; Ironman	Rugby; Oz Tag	Swimming	Bench; Press	Jet Ski	Beach; Sprint	Rowing	AFL Kick	Basketball	Boxing	Assault; Course	
Quade Cooper	60	100†	60	90	80	90	85	90	100	80	160	995
Shannon Eckstein	100†	45	90	80	70	80	45	55	45	100	180	890
Ken Wallace	90	75	80	100	90	60	85	30	45	70	80	805
Kurt Gidley	70	45†	70	60	50	70	45	55	80	50	200	795
Eamon Sullivan	80	45	100†	40	40	40	85	75	45	60	120	730
Luke Hodge	50	45	50	30	60	30	85	100†	70	90	100	710
Fabrice Lapierre	30	75	30	50	30	100†	45	40	90	40	140	670
Mark Winterbottom	40	90	40	70	100†	50	45	75	45	30	60	645

† indicates this event was the 'sports specific challenge' for this athlete
The contestant won the challenge
The contestant came second in the challenge
The contestant came last in the challenge
The contestant won the series
The contestant came second overall in the series
The contestant came last overall in the series
