= Australia's Greatest Athlete season 2 =

Australia's Greatest Athlete
- Season 2
- No. of episodes: 8

Release
- Original network: Seven Network
- Original release: 6 February – 28 February 2010

Season chronology
- ← Previous; Season 1 Next → Season 3

The second season of Australia's Greatest Athlete was broadcast on the Seven Network and hosted by Mark Beretta and Tom Williams, with Ricky Ponting presenting occasional fitness tips and interviews with the competitors in video packages. It was once again sponsored by Rexona, which had naming rights to the show.

Filming took place on Couran Cove Island Resort on South Stradbroke Island off the Gold Coast, Queensland.

Billy Slater, who won the first season of the show, returned to defend his title. By the end of the series, Slater had successfully defended his title by just 5 points, winning the title, trophy and $10,000 for the Royal Children's Hospital in Brisbane.

The season began on 6 February 2010 and aired at 4:30 pm on both Saturdays and Sundays, and concluded on 28 February 2010.

== Participants ==
- Matthew Mitcham – Olympic diving gold medallist
- Jason Culina – A-League soccer player
- Cameron Ling – Australian rules footballer
- James O'Connor – Rugby Union player
- Wendell Sailor – Rugby league and Rugby Union player
- Craig Lowndes – V8 Supercar driver
- Shannon Eckstein – Two-time world Ironman champion
- Billy Slater – NRL player and series defending champion

== Episodes ==
=== Episode 1 ===
- Mini Iron-man Challenge
- Poles Challenge

=== Episode 2 ===
- 25 m Swimming Challenge
- Soccer Challenge

=== Episode 3 ===
- Rugby Oztag Challenge
- Jet Ski Challenge

=== Episode 4 ===
- 40m Sprint
- Rock Climbing Challenge

=== Episode 5 ===
- NRL Sled Push
- Bench Press Challenge

=== Episode 6 ===
- Core Strength Challenge
- Kayaking Challenge

=== Episode 7 ===
- V8 Buggy Challenge
- AFL Kick For Goal

=== Episode 8 ===
- Pinguet Challenges

== Results table ==
The following table shows how many points each competitor earned throughout the series.

Competitor	Challenge															
	1	2	3	4	5	6	7	8	9	10	11	12	13	14	15	Total
	Mini; Ironman	Poles	25m Swim	Soccer	Rugby; Oztag	Jet Ski	40m Sprint	Rock; Climb	NRL; Sled Push	Bench; Press	Diving	Kayaking	V8 Buggy	AFL Kick	Multisport; Challenge	
Billy Slater	90	75	45	75	120	80	90	100†	90	95	95	90	90	80	200	1415
Shannon Eckstein	100†	100	100	90	100	70	80	80	45	80	95	100	70	120	180	1410
James O'Connor	80	45	90	55	45†	45	100	45	45	95	120	45	30	55	160	1055
Craig Lowndes	60	90	45	35	45	100	45	45	45	30	30	80	100†	70	140	960
Jason Culina	40	45	45	100†	90	45	45	70	80	40	110	45	80	55	60	950
Cameron Ling	70	45	45	75	45	90	45	45	70	55	50	45	60	90†	120	950
Matthew Mitcham	50	75	80	35	45	45	70	90	45	55	60†	70	40	30	100	890
Wendell Sailor	30	45	70	55	110	45	45	45	100†	70	40	45	50	40	80	870

† indicates this event was the 'sports specific challenge' for this athlete
The contestant won the challenge
The contestant came second in the challenge
The contestant came last in the challenge
The contestant won the series
The contestant came second overall in the series
The contestant came last overall in the series

== Trivia ==
- Matthew Mitcham and Cameron Ling were the only competitors not to have won an event.
