= Jamie Whincup =

Australian racing driver (born 1983)

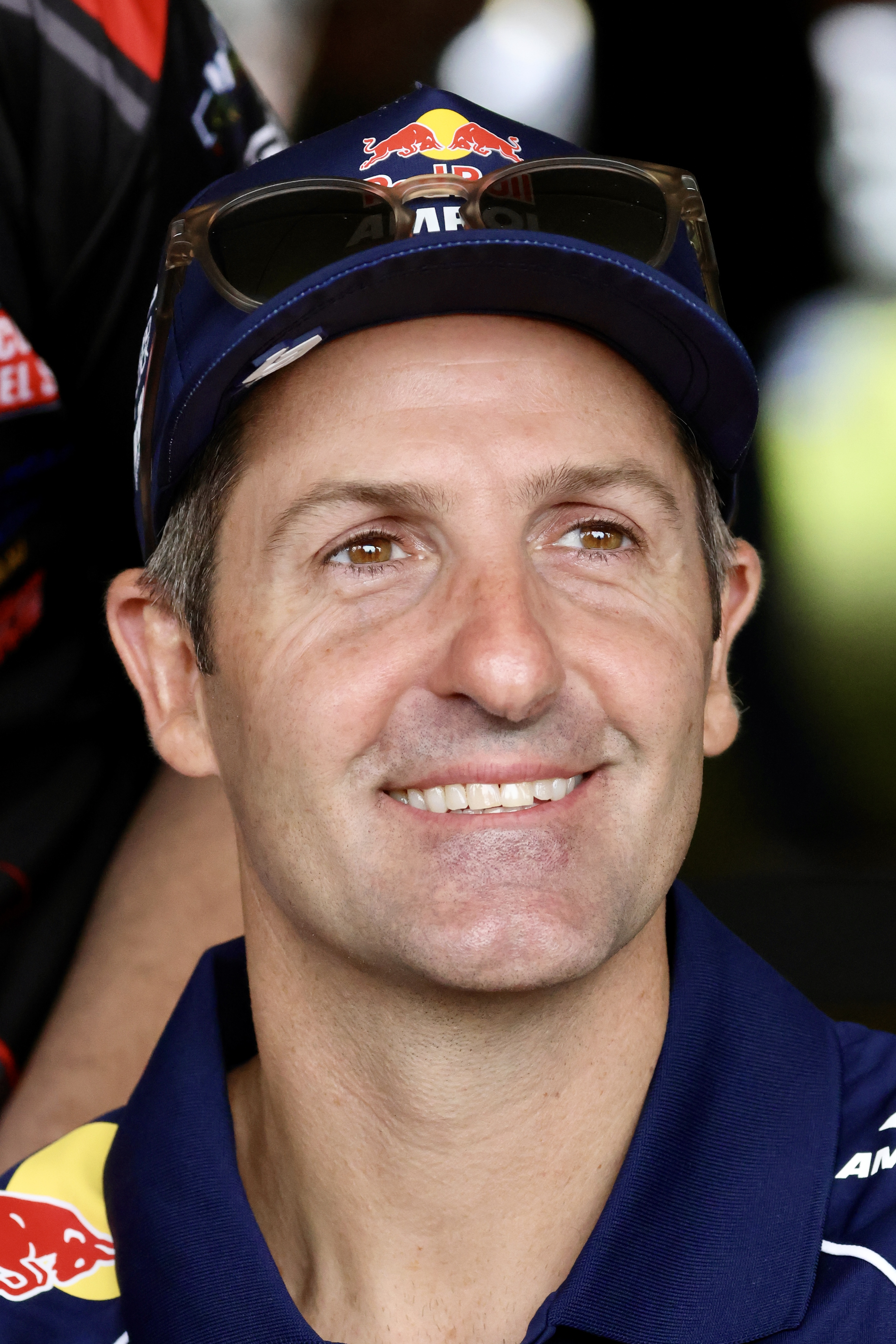
- Whincup at the 2026 Adelaide Motorsport Festival
- Born: Jamie David Whincup; 6 February 1983 (age 43); Melbourne, Victoria, Australia
- Partner: Courtney Nicholson (2010–2017)
- Awards: Full list

Supercars Championship career
- Current team: Triple Eight Race Engineering
- Championships: 7 (2008, 2009, 2011, 2012, 2013, 2014, 2017)
- Races: 561
- Wins: 125
- Podiums: 240
- Pole positions: 92
- 2021 position: 2nd (2719 pts)

Jamie David Whincup (born 6 February 1983) is an Australian professional racing driver competing in the Supercars Championship. He currently is team principal for Triple Eight Race Engineering. He has driven the No. 88 Holden ZB Commodore, won a record seven Supercars championship titles, four Bathurst 1000 victories, and a Bathurst 12 Hour victory. Whincup is the all-time record holder in the Supercars Championship for race wins, at 125 career wins. He is also the first driver to win the Jason Richards Memorial Trophy twice at Pukekohe Park Raceway in Auckland, New Zealand.

== Early life ==
Whincup was born in Melbourne, Australia to Sandra and David Whincup. He attended Eltham College in Research, Victoria. Whincup once lived with fellow driver Will Davison.

== Junior racing career ==
In 2001, Whincup embarked on the Australian Formula Ford Championship with a team run by his father and Uncle Graeme (a former Sports Sedan star) with mechanical support from fellow V8 Supercar driver Greg Ritter, racing with the Mygale Formula Ford team. After finishing third in his debut year, he moved to Sonic Motorsport(owner Michael Ritter, Brother of Greg Ritter ) for the 2002 season and went on to win the championship convincingly, which secured him his first ever V8 Supercar drive with Garry Rogers Motorsport.

== Professional career ==
=== Garry Rogers Motorsport ===
==== 2002 ====
Whincup made his Supercars debut in 2002 as an endurance co-driver for Garry Rogers Motorsport. His first event was at the 2002 Queensland 500 driving a Holden VX Commodore with Max Dumesny. He made his Bathurst 1000 debut at the next round, driving with Mark Noske. Whincup and Noske completed 72 laps before retiring from the race following a collision.

==== 2003 ====
Whincup continued with Garry Rogers Motorsport in 2003 and completed his first full time V8 Supercars season. Despite it being Whincup's first full time season, a string of crashes and incidents, most notably at Bathurst, saw the future champion sacked at seasons end.

=== Perkins Engineering ===
==== 2004 ====
For 2004, Whincup was not able to secure a full time drive. He, however, was able to secure a deal that saw him race in the enduro series alongside Alex Davison in a Castrol Rod Nash Racing VX Commodore prepared by Perkins Engineering. While a DNF at the Sandown 500 was a disappointment, Whincup and Davison achieved a very credible 9th place finish at the Bathurst 1000 after qualifying 29th and the highest of the three Castrol Commodore's.

=== Tasman Motorsport ===
Whincup landed himself a full-time drive in 2005 with the Melbourne-based Tasman Motorsport. He had many solid results throughout the season, including a fourth at the one-off Chinese round at the Shanghai International Circuit, a third at the Sandown 500 and most notably, second at the Bathurst 1000 endurance events with teammate Jason Richards after leading late in the race.

=== Triple Eight Race Engineering ===
==== 2006 ====
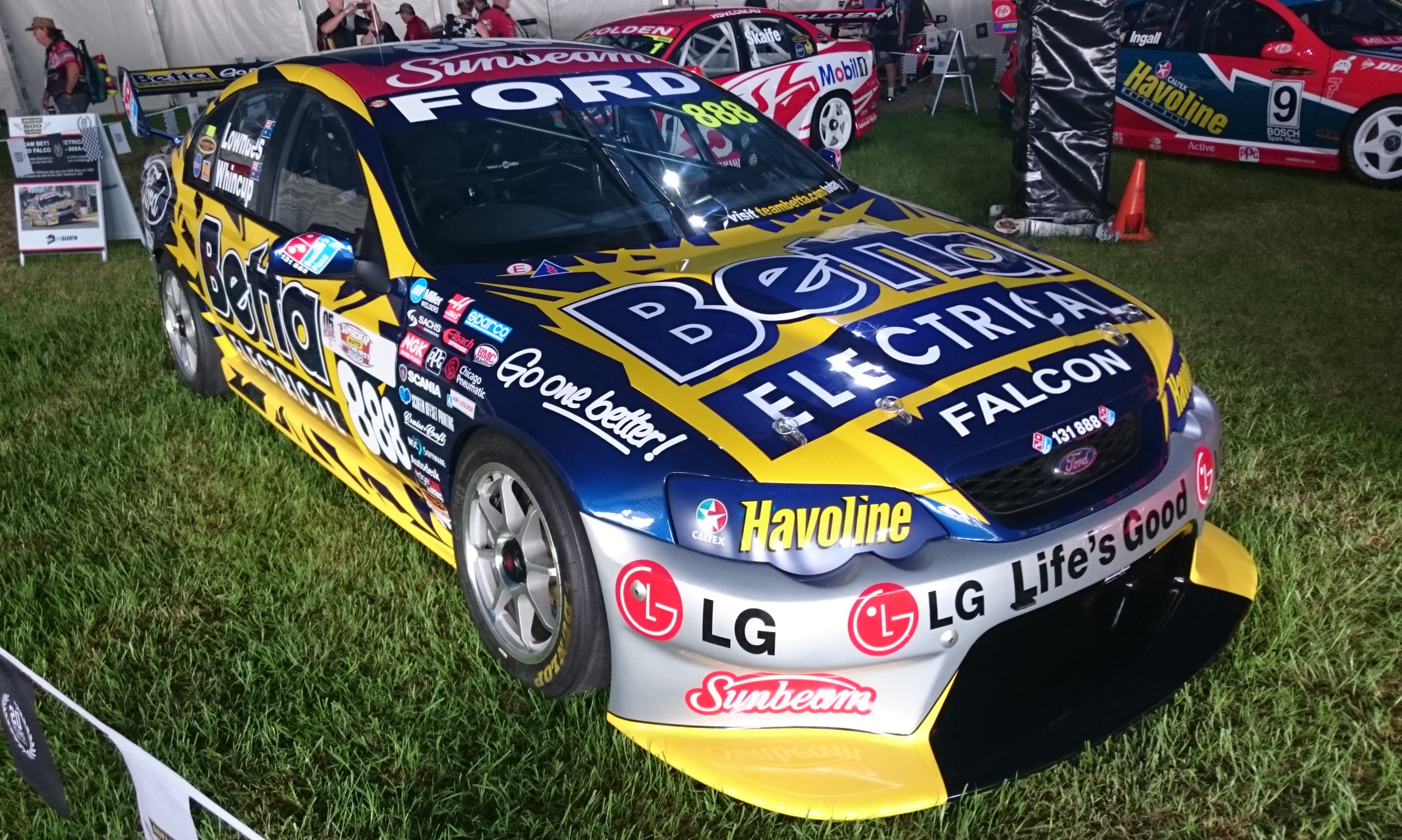
The Ford Falcon BA with which Whincup and Craig Lowndes won the 2006 Supercheap Auto Bathurst 1000. The car is pictured in 2018.

In 2006, Whincup jumped from Holden to Ford and joined Triple Eight Race Engineering alongside Craig Lowndes. Whincup had a stellar first season, taking victory in the two biggest races of the season, the Clipsal 500 and Supercheap Auto 1000, the latter as co-driver to Craig Lowndes. After some incidents and unreliability, Whincup finished the championship in a slightly disappointing tenth position at years end.

==== 2007 ====
In 2007, Whincup returned with the same team which was re-branded TeamVodafone and celebrated several victories included a second Bathurst 1000 title alongside teammate Craig Lowndes and new engineer Mark Dutton. Whincup finished second in the driver's title by a mere two points to Garth Tander from the HSV Dealer Team. Whincup began a mentoring role as part of TeamVodafone's Junior Development Program, and as a co-ambassador for Formula Ford Australia alongside Will Davison. His first round win for 2007, at a water-logged Winton, was the first round win for the year by a Ford driver. He celebrated both his 50th V8 Supercar Championship start and his inaugural pole position at Triple Eight Race Engineering's test track, Queensland Raceway. Whincup moved into the championship lead after a successful defence his and Lowndes' Bathurst 1000 crown, coming just weeks after teaming with Lowndes to win the last Sandown 500 until 2012. Entering Surfers Paradise for the Indy 300 with the series lead from Garth Tander, a difficult day on Sunday with a spin in the final race saw the lead revert to Tander who won the round. Whincup then had a disappointing weekend at Desert 400 at the Bahrain International Circuit, where poor qualifying pace for Triple Eight was compounded by a run of all three races marred by minor accidents, and he took away zero points. Tander and Craig Lowndes both had fairly good weekends, putting Tander into the series lead over Lowndes heading into the Symmons Plains race in Tasmania. Tander backed up his previous two round wins in Tasmania with a dominant race 1 win on Saturday, but a slow stop in race two dropped him to tenth, before disaster in race three after touching Steven Richards, he broke his steering and was out. Whincup won both races, and headed into the Grand Finale at Phillip Island on the 1–2 December weekend with a slender seven point championship lead. Whincup failed to keep his slender margin at Phillip Island; after Garth Tander won the first two races Whincup faced a seven-point deficit. After the final race Whincup finished second, behind Todd Kelly and two places ahead of Tander but fell just two points short of the title. At the 2007 V8 Supercar Gala Awards Dinner at the completion of the 2007 season, Whincup was awarded the Barry Sheene Medal, deemed to be the "Best and Fairest" award for V8 Supercars.

==== 2008 ====
Whincup won the 2008 Clipsal 500 in Adelaide, and won a further six rounds after that including the Bathurst 1000 for a third year running. During a post race interview at Symmons Plains, Whincup spun the car into a ditch whilst attempting to perform something special. He clinched his first Championship after winning the first race in the final round at Oran Park Raceway, and was awarded the Barry Sheene Medal for the second year running at the V8 Gala Awards.

==== 2009 ====
In 2009, Whincup successfully defended his title in a brand new Ford FG Falcon, including wins at Adelaide, Hamilton, Tasmania, Darwin, Townsville, Oueensland, Phillip Island and Barbagallo. Despite bad luck in the endurance races and at the Gold Coast, Whincup was able to put it all together at Sydney Olympic Park and became the first back-to-back championship winner since Marcos Ambrose in 2003–2004.

==== 2010 ====
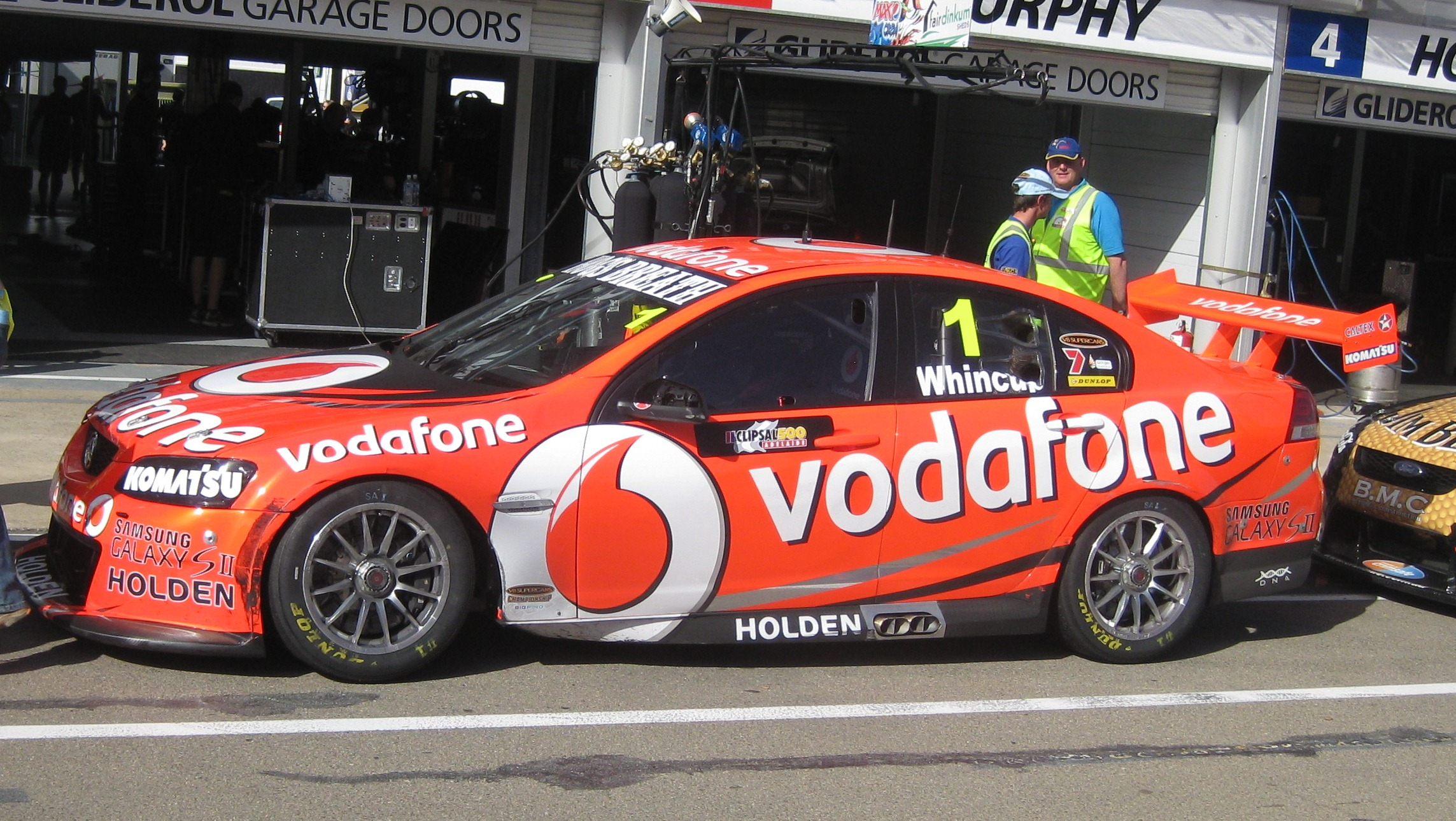
The Holden VE Commodore of Whincup at the 2012 Clipsal 500 Adelaide

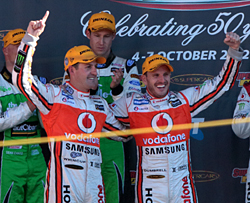
Jamie Whincup and Paul Dumbrell celebrate at the 2012 Supercheap Auto Bathurst 1000

In 2010, Triple Eight switched to Holden VE Commodores as Ford cut sponsorship. Whincup won the first four races of the season and Hamilton but a run of bad luck at Queensland raceway and Winton saw him relinquish the championship lead for the first time in two years, and sat second in the points table, just ahead of teammate Craig Lowndes in third. He became close to becoming a three-time champion, the next triple champion in a row after Mark Skaife from 2000 to 2002 and the second man to win the driver's championship in both a Ford and a Holden after Norm Beechey, but due to a multi car crash in the 25th race of the season at the Sydney Telstra 500 in wet weather his car was badly damaged and couldn't continue. In the 26th and final race of the season he was out of reach to score enough points to take back the lead from James Courtney (who had also been involved in the previous race's multi-car crash but had managed to get back on the track before the finish) and finished 2nd in the season.

==== 2011 ====
In 2011, Whincup regained the championship from James Courtney becoming the first International V8 Supercars Champion. Whincup won races in Abu Dhabi, Adelaide, Perth, Winton, Townsville, Gold Coast, Tasmania and Sandown. The title that went down to the final race in Sydney where Whincup beat teammate Craig Lowndes by 35 points. Triple Eight Race Engineering's season earned them 1st in the Teams Championship, their second Teams Championship with Holden.

==== 2012 ====
The 2012 season saw Whincup join Bob Jane, Allan Moffat and Jim Richards as a four-time series champion. Twelve race wins at Adelaide, Symmons Plains, Hidden Valley, Townsville, Sydney Motorsport Park, Abu Dhabi and Winton, and also the marquee endurance races, the Bathurst 1000 and the Gold Coast 600 resulted in a 339-point championship win over his teammate Lowndes.

==== 2013 ====
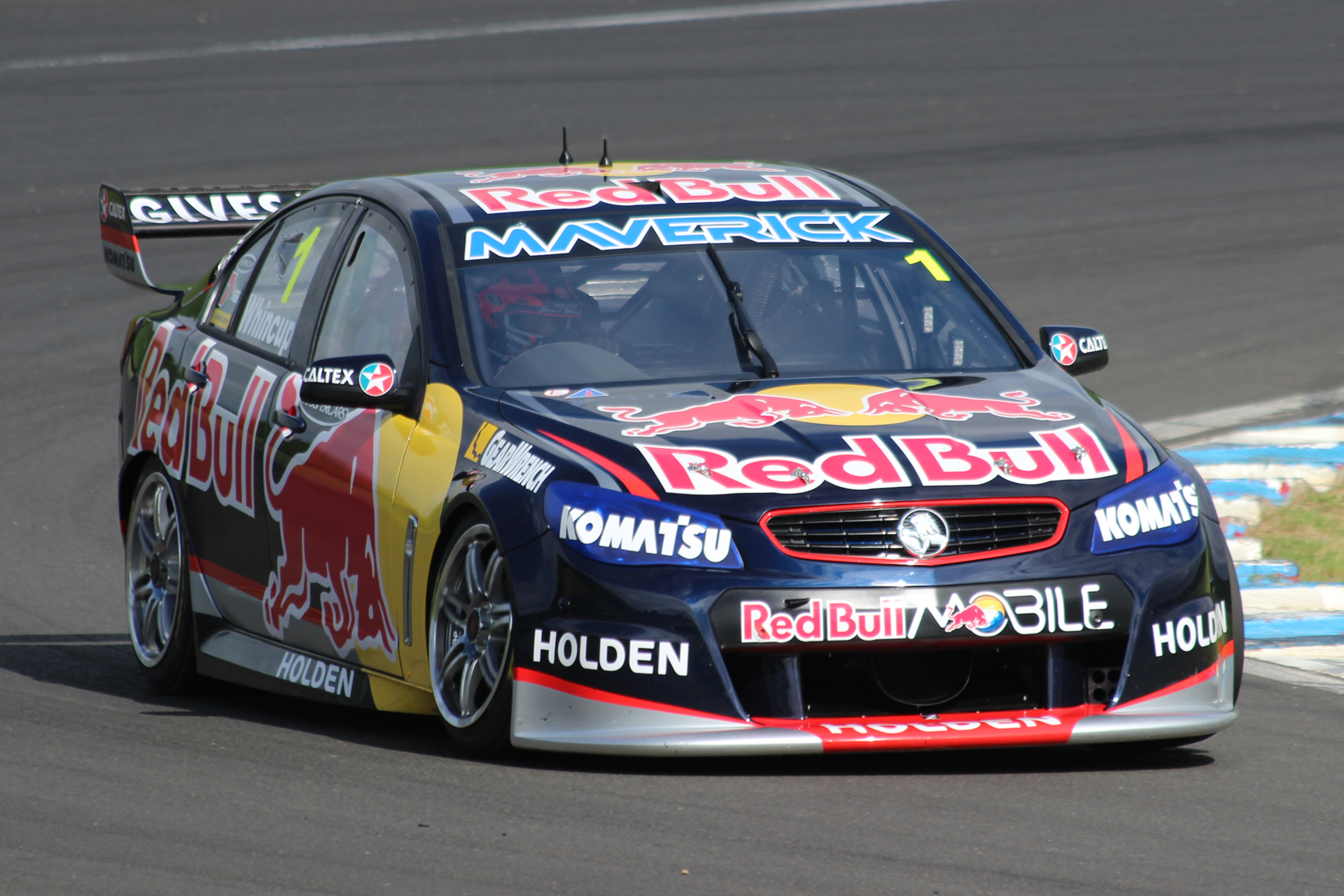
Whincup during testing in 2013 at the Sydney Motorsport Park

The 2012 season was the last of the Holden/Ford duopoly in V8 Supercars, as 2013 would see a new challenge arise in the form of two extra manufacturers - Nissan and Mercedes-Benz. Whincup would stay with Triple Eight Race Engineering and Holden, but with a new look - Red Bull replaced Vodafone as major sponsor, with the team to be known as Red Bull Racing Australia.

Despite the new era increasing outright competitiveness across the field and the season having 13 separate race winners, Whincup once again proved dominant. He won 11 out of the 34 races, winning at New Zealand, Barbagallo, Hidden Valley, Ipswich, Sandown, Phillip Island and Homebush. He was also victorious in the series' first outing to the US at the Circuit of the Americas, taking victory on three of four occasions. He went on to once again eclipse Lowndes in the points table, and earn himself a fifth title, putting himself alongside Ian Geoghegan, Dick Johnson and Mark Skaife in terms of championship successes.

==== 2014 ====
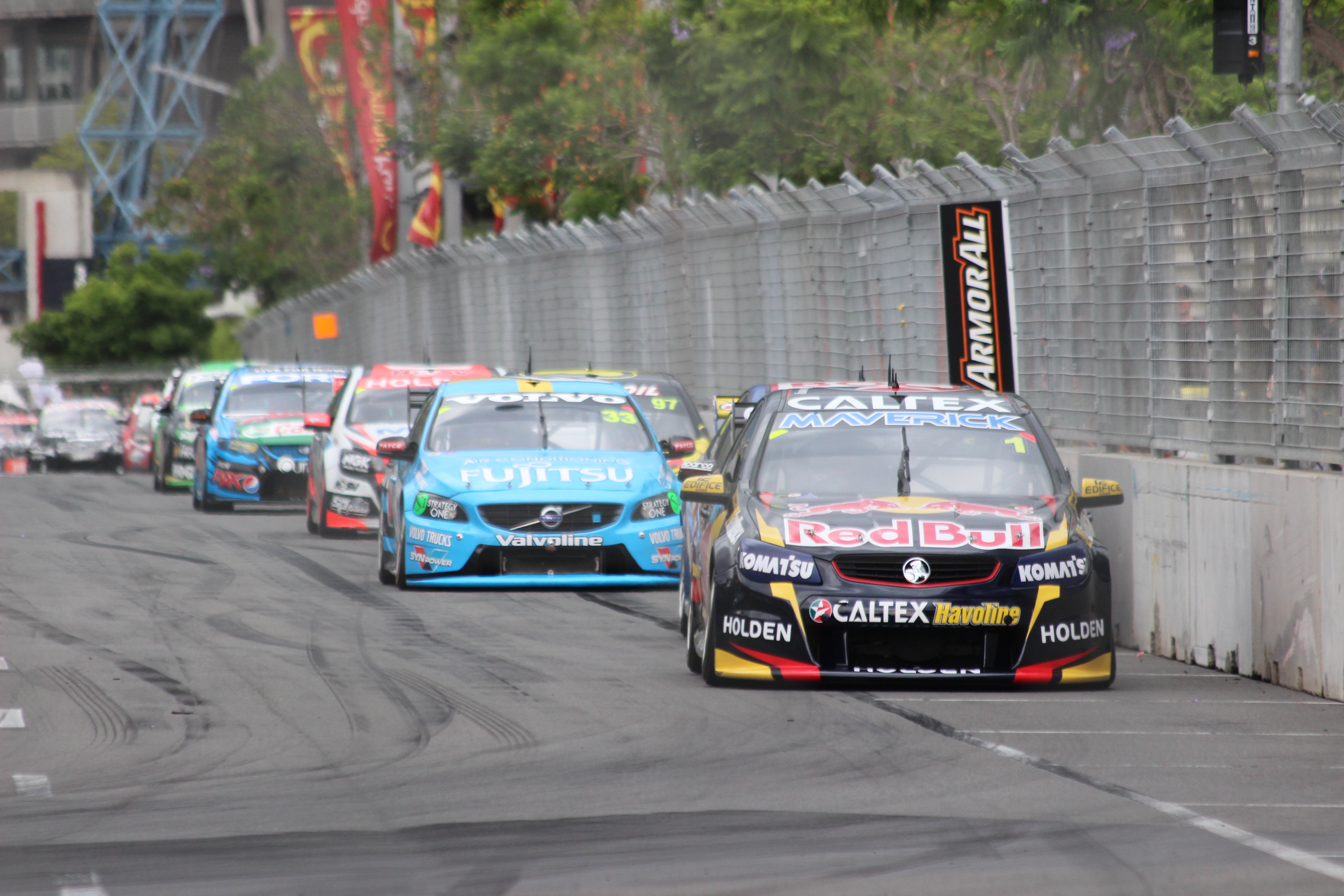
Whincup leads the field at the 2014 Sydney 500.

In 2014, Whincup would win a record sixth title. Once again partnering with Paul Dumbrell, he narrowly missed out on the Bathurst 1000 title for the second year running. After a final lap battles with Mark Winterbottom in 2013, this time he lost out to Ford Performance Racing teammate Chaz Mostert as he ran low on fuel. He did, however, win the Enduro Cup with Dumbrell as the most successful driver combination across the endurance events.

==== 2015 ====
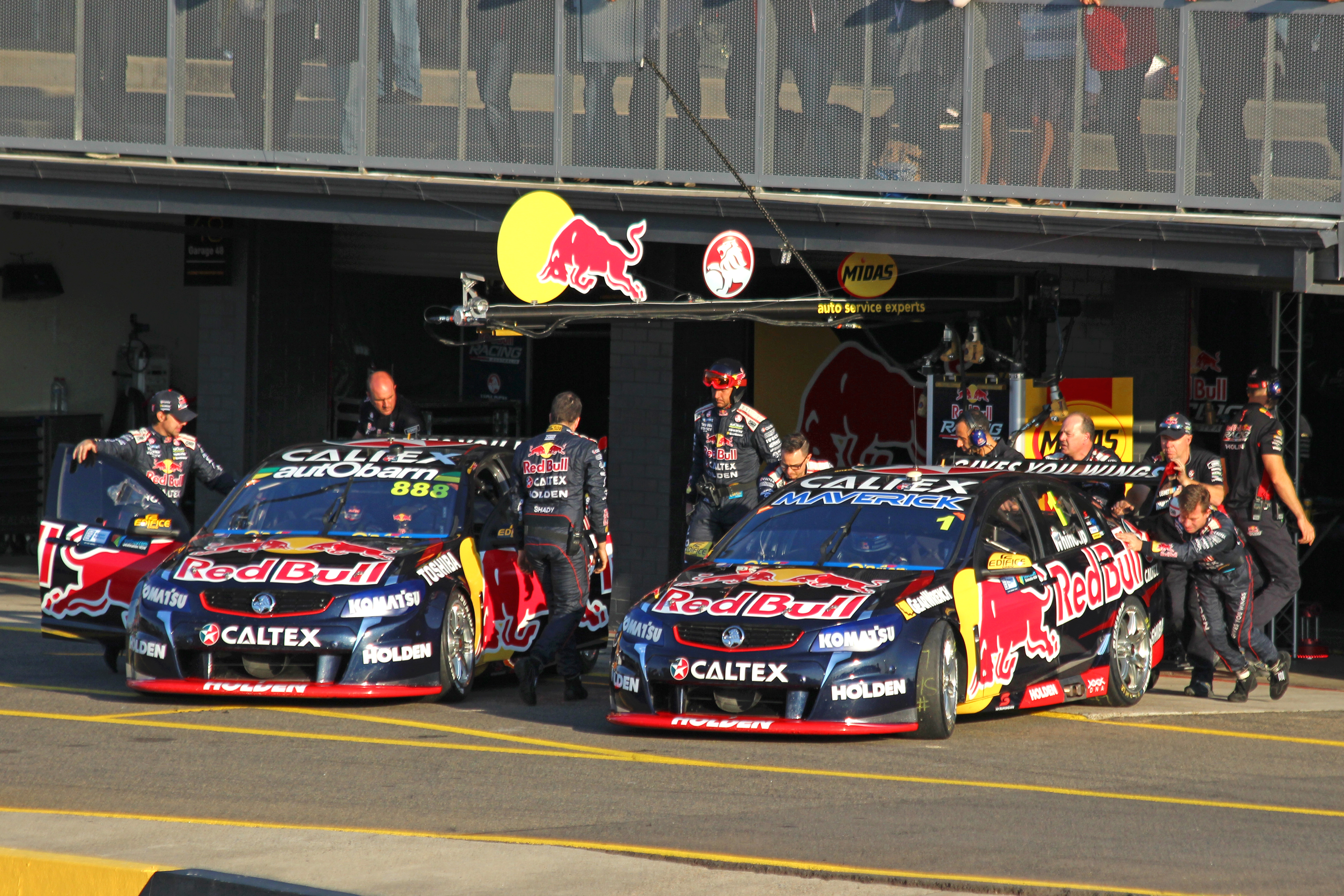
The Holden Commodore (VF) Whincup (right) and Craig Lowndes (left) prior to the second race of the 2015 Sydney Motorsport Park Super Sprint

During 2015 at Bathurst, Whincup had led the race mid-way through, only to wind up behind team-mate Lowndes thanks to a throttle sensor problem that required a long stop. He was still behind Lowndes when the crucial Safety Car period arrived in Lap 138, and decided to stay out for an extra lap rather than stack behind Lowndes in pit-lane despite being asked to pit by the Red Bull team. It was during that lap he made an illegal pass on the Safety Car, a pass that earned him a drive-through penalty and ruined any chance of taking a decent result away from Mount Panorama. After the race, Whincup has accepted full responsibility after a late race penalty for passing the Safety Car cost him a shot at a fifth Bathurst 1000 victory. Whincup misread a call which ultimately saw him illegally pass the Safety Car going up Mountain Straight as the critical final pitstops were unfolding. Whincup finished fifth in the championship 599-points adrift to long-time rival Winterbottom after a difficult season.

==== 2016 ====
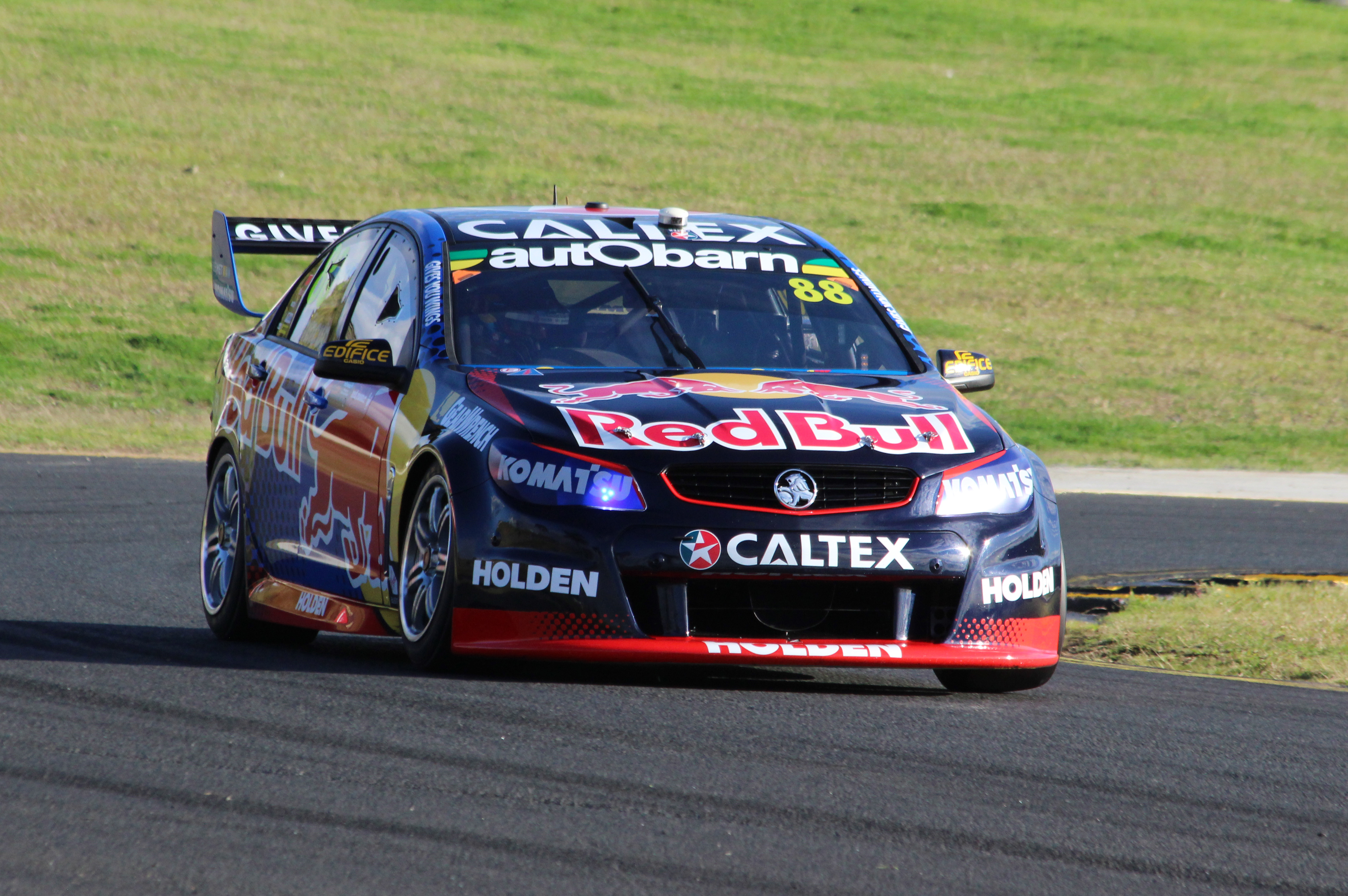
Whincup took his 100th championship race win at the 2016 Sydney SuperSprint.

In 2016, Whincup became the second driver in Supercars/ATCC history to win 100 races, the other being Triple Eight teammate Lowndes at the Sydney Motorsport Park. Triple Eight's strategy of making early first stops with all three of its cars paid dividends as the team stormed to its seventh straight victory. At the Bathurst 1000, Whincup would fail to win despite being the first to cross the finish line, due to a time penalty following a collision with Scott McLaughlin and Garth Tander. This penalty was later appealed by Triple Eight Race Engineering but the case was dismissed nine days after the race.

==== 2017 ====
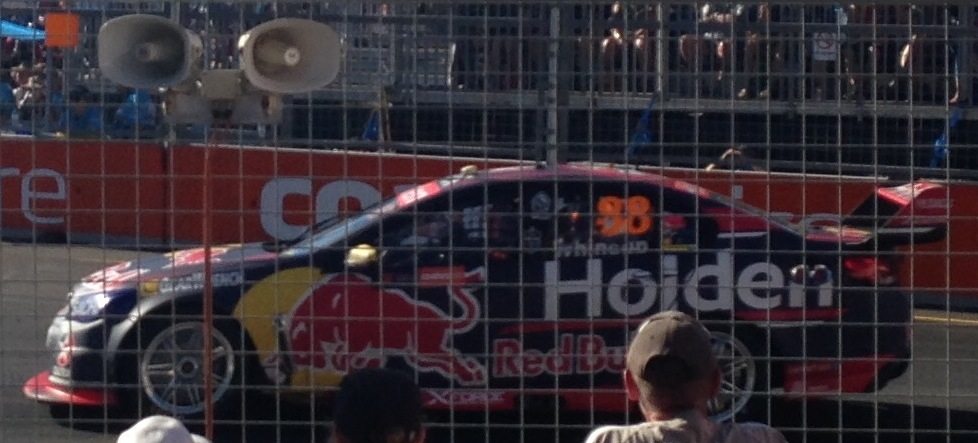
Whincup racing at the 2017 Newcastle 500

2017 saw Triple Eight become the official Holden factory squad under the banner Red Bull Holden Racing Team. Whincup and Triple Eight were in the shadow of Dick Johnson Racing Team Penske being out qualified and outraced by their drivers Scott McLaughlin and Fabian Coulthard. Whincup however proved, despite a lack of poles and wins by his standards, that consistency was key to his eventual championship win which he recorded in the final race in Newcastle after McLaughlin had received three penalties relegating him behind the 11th position he needed to win the championship. Whincup not only won his record seventh title but also the final race win for the Australian built Commodore.

==== 2018 ====
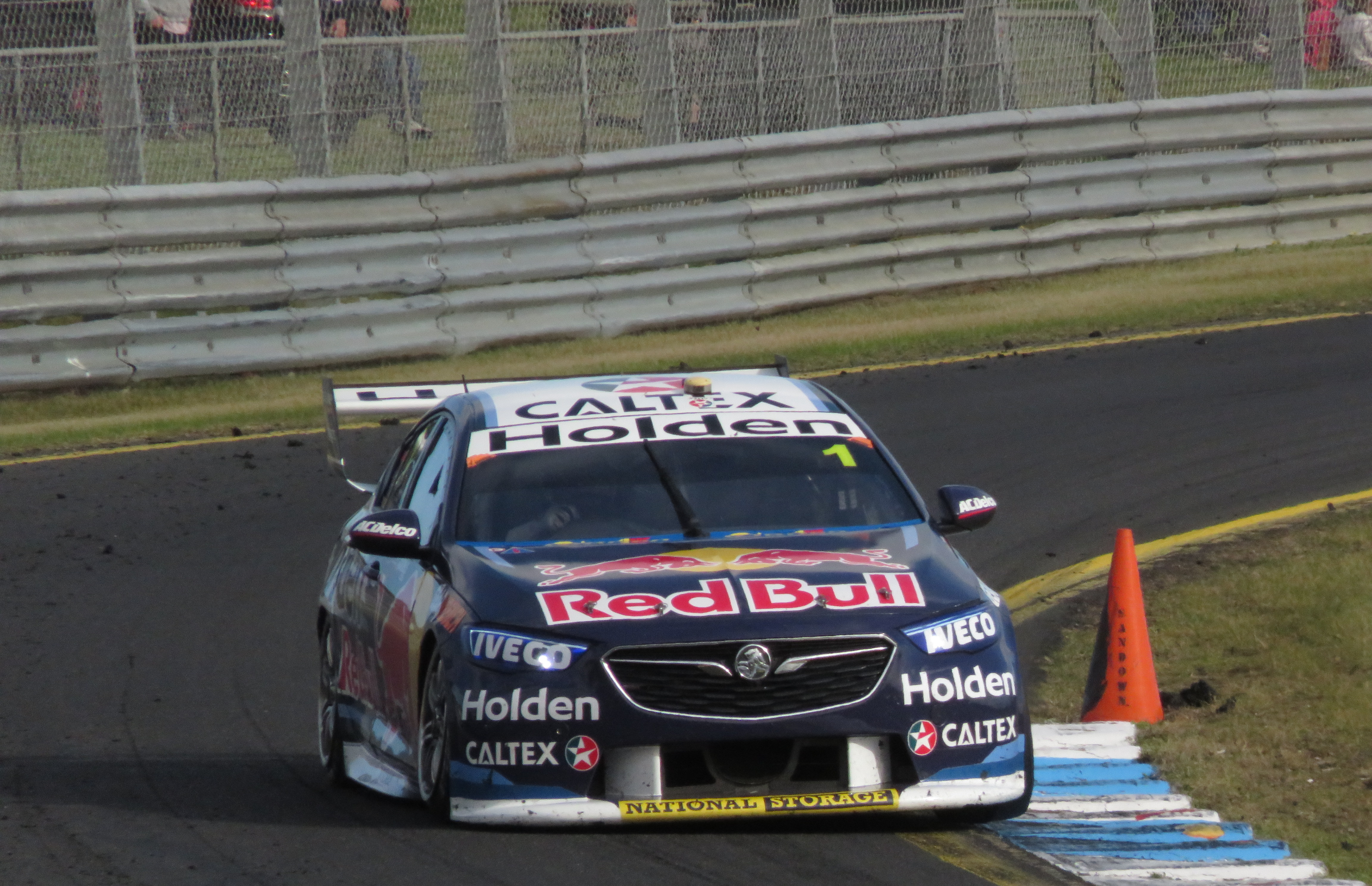
Whincup and Paul Dumbrell on their way to winning at the 2018 Sandown 500

In 2018, Whincup was one of 14 drivers in the field driving the Holden ZB Commodore. During the opening day of the Adelaide 500, Whincup overshadowed a thrilling qualifying session and slid wide through the high-speed sweeper on his final qualifying lap, slamming the outside concrete wall. His teammate Shane van Gisbergen claimed provisional two poles and won two races. But Whincup finished sixth in race 1 and failing a transmission failure ended up 26th in race 2. At the Melbourne Grand Prix Circuit, Whincup start on second and finished second in race 3. He takes the polesitter and claimed in race 4 opened his victory. Whincup finish second in race 5 and third in race 6, he took the inaugural Larry Perkins Trophy for being the highest points-scorer across the weekend, but was left disappointed by his start in the finale. After poor performances at Phillip Island, Barbagallo and Winton, Whincup finished third at Hidden Valley. Whincup marked the tenth running of the Townsville Street Circuit by taking his tenth race win in commanding fashion. Whincup took the lead from McLaughlin on lap two and controlled proceedings for the balance of the 70 laps, leading by more than ten seconds for the bulk of it. At Tailem Bend during the event, Whincup won the race 23 of The Bend Motorsport Park ahead of van Gisbergen, with David Reynolds third. On 16 September, Whincup and a co-driver Dumbrell led from start to finish and sweep of the Sandown 500 podium for a dominant Triple Eight Holden squad, as Enduro Cup kicked off. On 7 October 2018 at Bathurst, Dumbrell lost the right front wheel before hurtling down pit straight as the field went left at Hell Corner. Whincup finished the race in tenth position.

==== 2019 ====
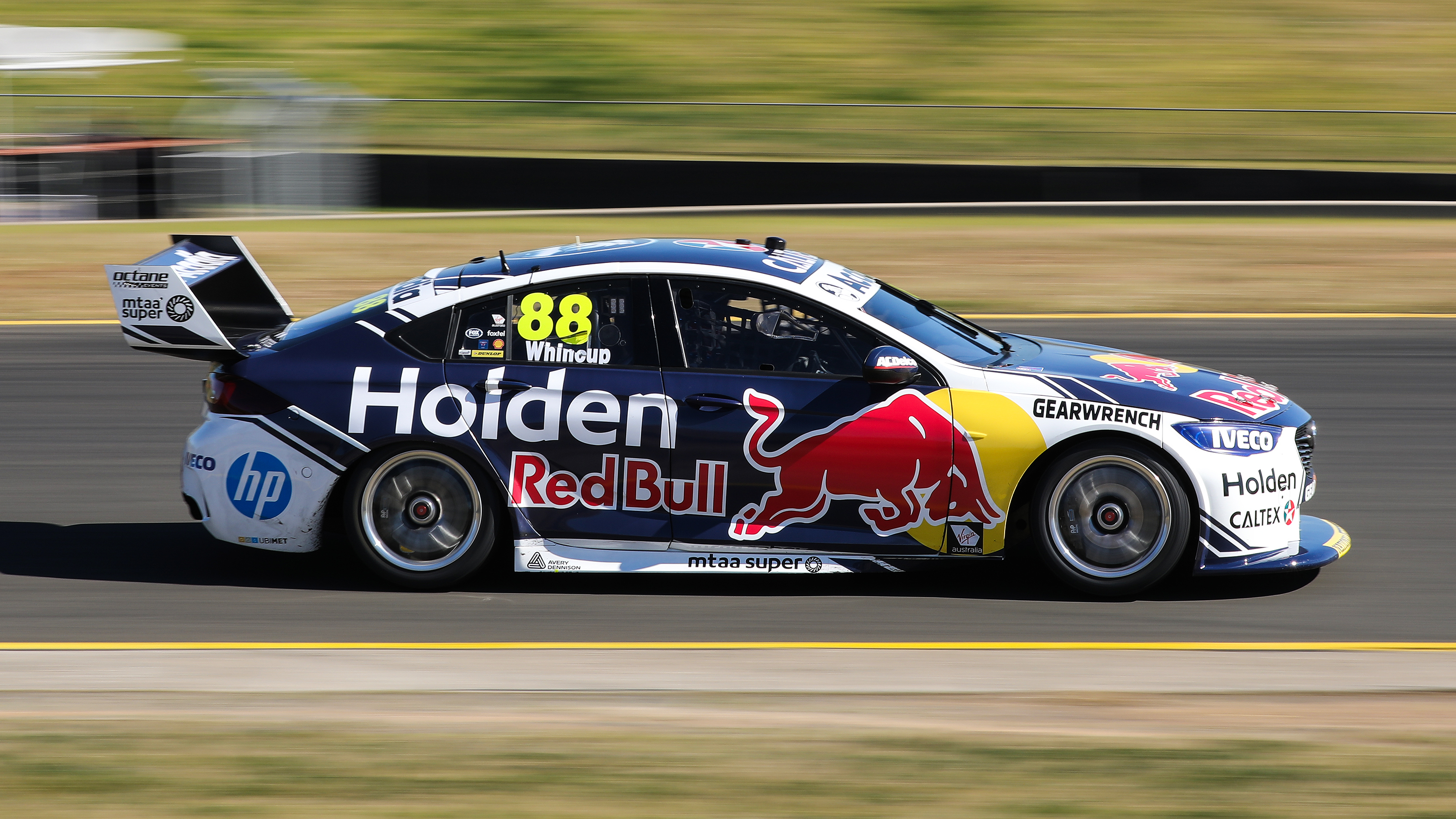
Whincup at a Ride Day in 2019

Whincup took his first win at the Ipswich SuperSprint drought by taking the win in an action-packed opening race at Queensland Raceway after the toughest weekends he's had with Triple Eight. On Race 24 at Pukekohe, Whincup was incorrectly picked up by the Safety Car despite being further back in the field due to having already taken his first compulsory pit stop, which prompted him to pass it without permission. Whincup took the chequered flag in 16th position and having dropped back to 20th immediately after serving his punishment. In November 2019, Whincup inherited the lead and won the race with Craig Lowndes, a repeat of their 2007 win together and their fifth and sixth wins of the race respectively, as Scott McLaughlin wrapped up successive championships. He won five races and finished in third position in the championship standings.

==== 2020 ====
In 2020 season, the General Motors announced that the Holden brand would be retired by 2021. On 22 February, Whincup won the first race in Superloop Adelaide 500 and become the 119th career race win was his 86th in a Holden, moving one ahead of former Triple Eight teammate turned co-driver Craig Lowndes on the all-time tally. At the final round of the Bathurst 1000, Whincup was battling with Brodie Kostecki and Chaz Mostert when he ran wide at The Cutting and hit the wall on Lap 33. Lowndes, who had just hopped out of the #888 entry, was philosophical about the crash. It was the first time since 2002 that Whincup and Lowndes had suffered a DNF and claimed four wins and fourth in the Championship due the COVID-19 pandemic.

== GT Racing ==
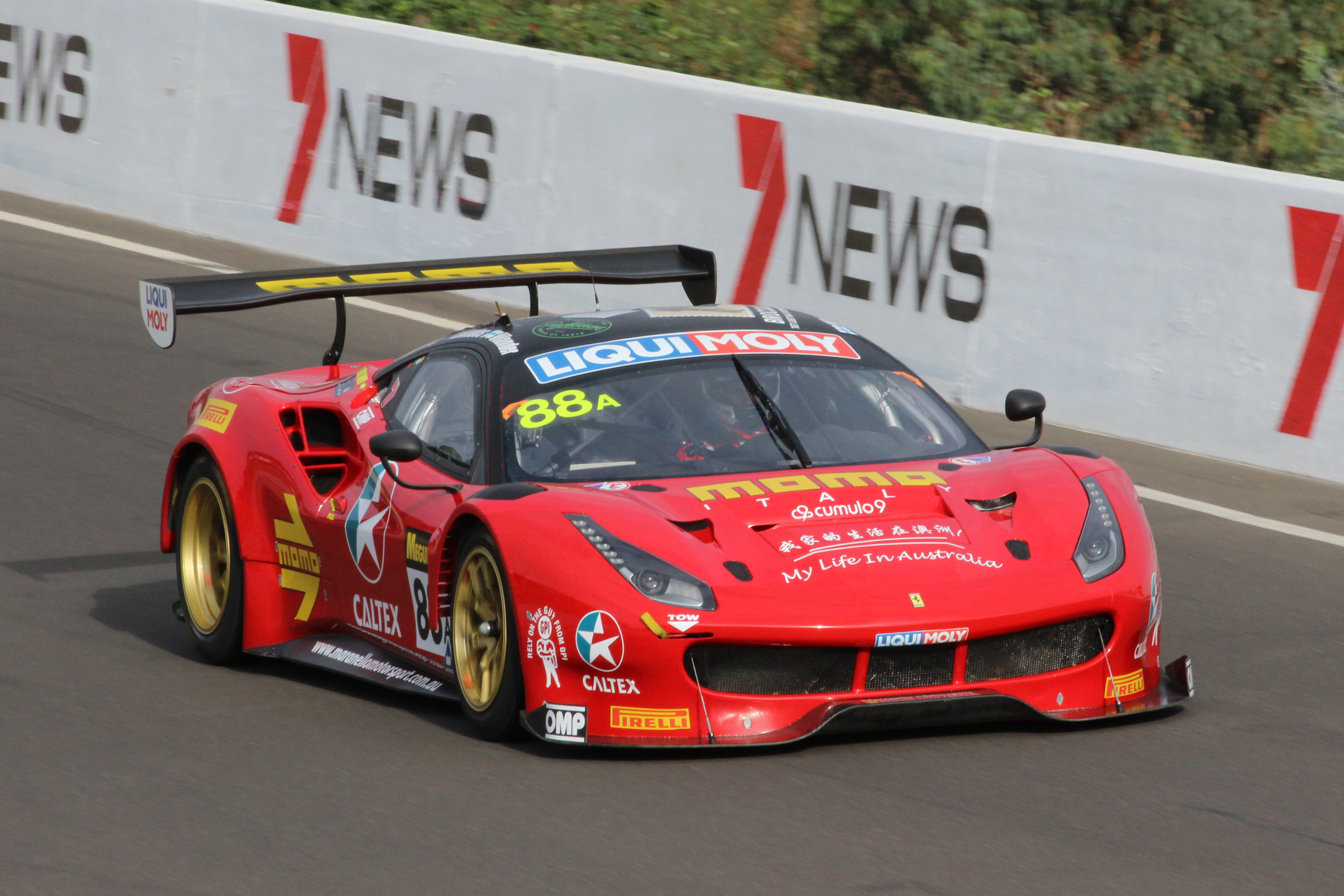
The race-winning Ferrari 488 GT3 of Whincup, Toni Vilander and Craig Lowndes at the 2017 Liqui Moly Bathurst 12 Hour

On 5 February 2017, Whincup drove in and won his first ever GT race when he teamed with Lowndes and Finnish driver Toni Vilander to win the 2017 Liqui Moly Bathurst 12 Hour driving a Ferrari 488 GT3 for Maranello Motorsport. By winning the Bathurst 12 Hour, Whincup joined Triple Eight teammate Craig Lowndes and as well as Gregg Hansford, Allan Grice, Tony Longhurst, John Bowe, Dick Johnson, Paul Morris and Jonathon Webb as winners of both the Bathurst 1000 and Bathurst 12 Hour races.

== Business career ==
In 2016, Whincup opened Loca Cafe, a café and car wash business, in Hope Island, Queensland.

In 2018, Whincup took a 15% ownership stake in Triple Eight Race Engineering, subsequently increasing this to 30%.

== Personal life ==
Whincup lives in Hope Island in Queensland near his Loca Cafe business venture. Whincup appeared on season 1 of the reality television program Australia's Greatest Athlete in 2009.

== Awards and honours ==
He became the first driver to win the Jason Richards Memorial Trophy twice at Pukekohe Park Raceway in Auckland, New Zealand.

== Racing record ==
=== Karting career summary ===
Season	Series	Position
1993	J.C. Maddox Karting Trophy	**1st**
1995	J.C. Maddox Karting Trophy	**1st**
1996	Victorian Junior Karter of the Year	**1st**

=== Racing career summary ===
Season	Series	Position	Car	Team
2000	Victorian Formula Ford Championship	5th	Van Diemen RF94 Ford	
2001	Australian Formula Ford Championship	**3rd**	Mygale SJ2000 Ford	
2002	Australian Formula Ford Championship	**1st**	Van Diemen RF01 Ford	Sonic Motorsport
2002	V8 Supercar Championship Series	63rd	Holden VX Commodore	Garry Rogers Motorsport
2003	V8 Supercar Championship Series	27th	Holden VX Commodore; Holden VY Commodore	Garry Rogers Motorsport
2004	V8 Supercar Championship Series	50th	Holden VX Commodore	Castrol Perkins Racing
2005	V8 Supercar Championship Series	16th	Holden VZ Commodore	Tasman Motorsport
2006	V8 Supercar Championship Series	10th	Ford BA Falcon	Triple Eight Race Engineering
2007	V8 Supercar Championship Series	**2nd**	Ford BF Falcon	Triple Eight Race Engineering
2008	V8 Supercar Championship Series	**1st**	Ford BF Falcon	Triple Eight Race Engineering
2009	V8 Supercar Championship Series	**1st**	Ford FG Falcon	Triple Eight Race Engineering
2010	V8 Supercar Championship Series	**2nd**	Holden VE Commodore	Triple Eight Race Engineering
2011	International V8 Supercars Championship	**1st**	Holden VE Commodore	Triple Eight Race Engineering
2012	International V8 Supercars Championship	**1st**	Holden VE Commodore	Triple Eight Race Engineering
2013	International V8 Supercars Championship	**1st**	Holden VF Commodore	Triple Eight Race Engineering
2014	International V8 Supercars Championship	**1st**	Holden VF Commodore	Triple Eight Race Engineering
2015	International V8 Supercars Championship	5th	Holden VF Commodore	Triple Eight Race Engineering
2016	International V8 Supercars Championship	**2nd**	Holden VF Commodore	Triple Eight Race Engineering
2017	Virgin Australia Supercars Championship	**1st**	Holden VF Commodore	Triple Eight Race Engineering
2018	Virgin Australia Supercars Championship	**3rd**	Holden ZB Commodore	Triple Eight Race Engineering
2019	Virgin Australia Supercars Championship	**3rd**	Holden ZB Commodore	Triple Eight Race Engineering
2020	Virgin Australia Supercars Championship	4th	Holden ZB Commodore	Triple Eight Race Engineering
2021	Repco Supercars Championship	**2nd**	Holden ZB Commodore	Triple Eight Race Engineering
2022	Repco Supercars Championship	33rd	Holden ZB Commodore	Triple Eight Race Engineering
2023	Repco Supercars Championship	30th	Chevrolet Camaro ZL1	Triple Eight Race Engineering
2024	Repco Supercars Championship	27th	Chevrolet Camaro ZL1	Triple Eight Race Engineering
2025	Repco Supercars Championship	36th	Chevrolet Camaro ZL1	Triple Eight Race Engineering

=== Supercars Championship results ===
(Races in bold indicate pole position) (Races in italics indicate fastest lap)

Supercars results
Year	Team	No.	Car	1	2	3	4	5	6	7	8	9	10	11	12	13	14	15	16	17	18	19	20	21	22	23	24	25	26	27	28	29	30	31	32	33	34	35	36	37	38	39	Position	Points
2002	Garry Rogers Motorsport	35	Holden VX Commodore	ADE; R1	ADE; R2	PHI; R3	PHI; R4	EAS; R5	EAS; R6	EAS; R7	HDV; R8	HDV; R9	HDV; R10	CAN; R11	CAN; R12	CAN; R13	BAR; R14	BAR; R15	BAR; R16	ORA; R17	ORA; R18	WIN; R19	WIN; R20	QLD; R21; 20	BAT; R22; Ret	SUR; R23	SUR; R24	PUK; R25	PUK; R26	PUK; R27	SAN; R28	SAN; R29											63rd	26
2003	Garry Rogers Motorsport	33	Holden VX Commodore	ADE; R1; 17	ADE; R1; 22	PHI; R3; 25	EAS; R4; Ret	WIN; R5; Ret	BAR; R6; 22	BAR; R7; Ret	BAR; R8; 21	HDV; R9; 20	HDV; R10; Ret	HDV; R11; 11	QLD; R12; 16	ORA; R13; 20	SAN; R14; 29	BAT; R15; 19	SUR; R16; 25	SUR; R17; 12	PUK; R18; 28	PUK; R19; 17	PUK; R20; Ret	EAS; R21; 13	EAS; R22; 15																		27th	906
2004	Rod Nash Racing	7	Holden VX Commodore	ADE; R1	ADE; R2	EAS; R3	PUK; R4	PUK; R5	PUK; R6	HDV; R7	HDV; R8	HDV; R9	BAR; R10	BAR; R11	BAR; R12	QLD; R13	WIN; R14	ORA; R15	ORA; R16	SAN; R17; Ret	BAT; R18; 9	SUR; R19	SUR; R20	SYM; R21	SYM; R22	SYM; R23	EAS; R24	EAS; R25	EAS; R26														50th	160
2005	Tasman Motorsport	23	Holden VZ Commodore	ADE; R1; 10	ADE; R2; 22	PUK; R3; 10	PUK; R4; 28	PUK; R5; 11	BAR; R6; 13	BAR; R7; 24	BAR; R8; 14	EAS; R9; 24	EAS; R10; 15	SHA; R11; 9	SHA; R12; 8	SHA; R13; 4	HDV; R14; 15	HDV; R15; 14	HDV; R16; 17	QLD; R17; 28	ORA; R18; Ret	ORA; R19; 15	SAN; R20; 3	BAT; R21; 2	SUR; R22; 15	SUR; R23; 8	SUR; R24; 10	SYM; R25; 18	SYM; R26; Ret	SYM; R27; 30	PHI; R28; 12	PHI; R29; 18	PHI; R30; Ret										16th	1307
2006	Triple Eight Race Engineering	88	Ford BA Falcon	ADE; R1; 3	ADE; R2; 1	PUK; R3; 15	PUK; R4; Ret	PUK; R5; 10	BAR; R6; 21	BAR; R7; 4	BAR; R8; 9	WIN; R9; 25	WIN; R10; 2	WIN; R11; 9	HDV; R12; 9	HDV; R13; 5	HDV; R14; 26	QLD; R15; 8	QLD; R16; 27	QLD; R17; 8	ORA; R18; 5	ORA; R19; 6	ORA; R20; Ret	SAN; R21; 3	BAT; R22; 1	SUR; R23; Ret	SUR; R24; 22	SUR; R25; 8	SYM; R26; Ret	SYM; R27; DNS	SYM; R28; DNS	BHR; R29; 10	BHR; R30; 6	BHR; R31; Ret	PHI; R32; 26	PHI; R33; 9	PHI; R34; 7						10th	2357
2007	Triple Eight Race Engineering	88	Ford BF Falcon	ADE; R1; 3	ADE; R2; 5	BAR; R3; 7	BAR; R4; 23	BAR; R5; 18	PUK; R6; 4	PUK; R7; 2	PUK; R8; 5	WIN; R9; 1	**WIN**; **R10**; 2	WIN; R11; 2	EAS; R12; 2	EAS; R13; 3	EAS; R14; EX	HDV; R15; 5	HDV; R16; 4	HDV; R17; 26	**QLD**; **R18**; 4	QLD; R19; 2	QLD; R20; 3	ORA; R21; 3	ORA; R22; Ret	ORA; R23; 4	SAN; R24; 1	BAT; R25; 1	SUR; R26; 2	SUR; R27; 2	SUR; R28; Ret	BHR; R29; Ret	BHR; R30; 22	BHR; R31; 16	SYM; R32; 2	SYM; R33; 1	**SYM**; **R34**; 1	PHI; R35; 3	PHI; R36; 3	PHI; R37; 2			2nd	623
2008	Triple Eight Race Engineering	88	Ford BF Falcon	ADE; R1; 1	**ADE**; **R2**; 1	EAS; R3; 3	EAS; R4; 5	EAS; R5; 4	HAM; R6; DNS	HAM; R7; DNS	HAM; R8; DNS	BAR; R9; 7	BAR; R10; 3	BAR; R11; 3	**SAN**; **R12**; 1	SAN; R13; 3	SAN; R14; 1	HDV; R15; 4	HDV; R16; 5	HDV; R17; 8	QLD; R18; 9	QLD; R19; 3	QLD; R20; 6	WIN; R21; 1	**WIN**; **R22**; 4	WIN; R23; 2	PHI; QR; 1	**PHI**; **R24**; 2	BAT; R25; 1	**SUR**; **R26**; 1	**SUR**; **R27**; 1	**SUR**; **R28**; 1	**BHR**; **R29**; 1	BHR; R30; 1	**BHR**; **R31**; 1	SYM; R32; 2	SYM; R33; 1	**SYM**; **R34**; 1	**ORA**; **R35**; 1	**ORA**; **R36**; Ret	ORA; R37; 23		1st	3332
2009	Triple Eight Race Engineering	1	Ford FG Falcon	**ADE**; **R1**; 1	**ADE**; **R2**; 1	HAM; R3; 1	HAM; R4; 1	WIN; R5; 2	**WIN**; **R6**; 13	SYM; R7; 8	**SYM**; **R8**; 1	HDV; R9; 1	HDV; R10; 10	TOW; R11; 1	TOW; R12; 2	SAN; R13; 6	SAN; R14; 3	**QLD**; **R15**; 1	QLD; R16; 13	PHI; QR; 18	PHI; R17; 2	BAT; R18; 5	SUR; R19; 13	SUR; R20; 8	SUR; R21; Ret	SUR; R22; 6	PHI; R23; 1	**PHI**; **R24**; 1	BAR; R25; 1	**BAR**; **R26**; 4	SYD; R27; 5	SYD; R28; 14											1st	3349
2010	Triple Eight Race Engineering	1	Holden VE Commodore	**YMC**; **R1**; 1	YMC; R2; 1	**BHR**; **R3**; 1	**BHR**; **R4**; 1	ADE; R5; 4	ADE; R6; 18	**HAM**; **R7**; 1	**HAM**; **R8**; 1	QLD; R9; 4	QLD; R10; Ret	WIN; R11; 3	WIN; R12; 24	HDV; R13; 2	HDV; R14; 1	TOW; R15; 1	TOW; R16; 23	PHI; QR; 2	PHI; R17; 29	BAT; R18; 2	SUR; R19; 6	SUR; R20; 1	SYM; R21; 6	SYM; R22; 15	SAN; R23; 2	SAN; R24; 3	SYD; R25; Ret	SYD; R26; 5													2nd	2990
2011	Triple Eight Race Engineering	88	Holden VE Commodore	YMC; R1; 1	YMC; R2; 3	ADE; R3; 2	ADE; R4; 1	**HAM**; **R5**; 23	HAM; R6; 18	**BAR**; **R7**; 1	**BAR**; **R8**; 2	BAR; R9; 1	WIN; R10; 1	WIN; R11; 2	HID; R12; 9	HID; R13; 6	TOW; R14; 2	TOW; R15; 1	QLD; R16; 3	QLD; R17; 2	QLD; R18; 10	PHI; QR; 12	PHI; R19; 2	BAT; R20; 21	**SUR**; **R21**; 1	**SUR**; **R22**; 2	**SYM**; **R23**; 1	SYM; R24; 1	SAN; R25; 13	SAN; R26; 1	SYD; R27; 20	SYD; R28; 8											1st	3168
2012	Triple Eight Race Engineering	1	Holden VE Commodore	ADE; R1; 1	**ADE**; **R2**; 4	SYM; R3; 3	SYM; R4; 1	HAM; R5; 2	HAM; R6; 2	BAR; R7; 2	**BAR**; **R8**; 2	BAR; R9; 3	PHI; R10; Ret	PHI; R11; 5	HID; R12; 1	HID; R13; 2	TOW; R14; 1	TOW; R15; 1	QLD; R16; 3	QLD; R17; 3	**SMP**; **R18**; 23	SMP; R19; 1	SAN; QR; 19	SAN; R20; 3	BAT; R21; 1	**SUR**; **R22**; 1	**SUR**; **R23**; 2	YMC; R24; 1	YMC; R25; 1	YMC; R26; 1	WIN; R27; 1	WIN; R28; 3	SYD; R29; 5	SYD; R30; 5									1st	3861
2013	Triple Eight Race Engineering	1	Holden VF Commodore	ADE; R1; 3	ADE; R2; 2	**SYM**; **R3**; 2	SYM; R4; 4	SYM; R5; 5	**PUK**; **R6**; 26	PUK; R7; 1	**PUK**; **R8**; 24	PUK; R9; 3	**BAR**; **R10**; 2	BAR; R11; 1	BAR; R12; 1	COA; R13; 1	**COA**; **R14**; 1	**COA**; **R15**; 3	**COA**; **R16**; 1	HID; R17; 1	HID; R18; 5	HID; R19; 19	TOW; R20; 7	TOW; R21; 11	**QLD**; **R22**; 1	**QLD**; **R23**; 2	QLD; R24; 25	WIN; R25; Ret	WIN; R26; Ret	WIN; R27; 13	SAN; QR; 2	SAN; R28; 1	**BAT**; **R29**; 2	SUR; R30; Ret	SUR; R31; 4	PHI; R32; 4	PHI; R33; 2	PHI; R34; 1	**SYD**; **R35**; 1	SYD; R36; 3			1st	3094
2014	Triple Eight Race Engineering	1	Holden VF Commodore	**ADE**; **R1**; 1	ADE; R2; 3	ADE; R3; 15	**SYM**; **R4**; 1	**SYM**; **R5**; 1	**SYM**; **R6**; 2	WIN; R7; 9	WIN; R8; 19	WIN; R9; 10	PUK; R10; 24	PUK; R11; 4	PUK; R12; 4	PUK; R13; 10	BAR; R14; 17	BAR; R15; 3	BAR; R16; 4	**HID**; **R17**; 1	**HID**; **R18**; 1	HID; R19; 3	TOW; R20; 1	TOW; R21; 7	TOW; R22; 1	QLD; R23; 1	**QLD**; **R24**; 1	QLD; R25; 6	SMP; R26; 4	SMP; R27; 3	SMP; R28; 5	SAN; QR; 1	SAN; R29; 1	BAT; R30; 5	SUR; R31; 2	SUR; R32; 1	PHI; R33; 3	**PHI**; **R34**; 1	PHI; R35; 4	SYD; R36; 1	SYD; R37; 1	SYD; R38; 4	1st	3364
2015	Triple Eight Race Engineering	1	Holden VF Commodore	**ADE**; **R1**; 1	**ADE**; **R2**; 21	ADE; R3; 4	SYM; R4; 7	SYM; R5; 2	SYM; R6; 1	**BAR**; **R7**; 15	BAR; R8; 2	BAR; R9; 19	WIN; R10; 9	WIN; R11; 6	WIN; R12; 10	HID; R13; 11	HID; R14; 16	HID; R15; 22	TOW; R16; 9	TOW; R17; 5	QLD; R18; 8	QLD; R19; 5	QLD; R20; 8	SMP; R21; 3	SMP; R22; 1	SMP; R23; 14	SAN; QR; 1	**SAN**; **R24**; 15	BAT; R25; 18	SUR; R26; 24	SUR; R27; 7	**PUK**; **R28**; 1	PUK; R29; 2	PUK; R30; 1	**PHI**; **R31**; 2	PHI; R32; 1	PHI; R33; 3	SYD; R34; 1	**SYD**; **R35**; 1	SYD; R36; 2			5th	2647
2016	Triple Eight Race Engineering	88	Holden VF Commodore	ADE; R1; 1	ADE; R2; 2	ADE; R3; 14	SYM; R4; 2	SYM; R5; 19	PHI; R6; 2	PHI; R7; 4	BAR; R8; 3	BAR; R9; 11	WIN; R10; 5	WIN; R11; 9	HID; R12; 2	HID; R13; 8	**TOW**; **R14**; 1	TOW; R15; 4	QLD; R16; 2	**QLD**; **R17**; 2	SMP; R18; 2	SMP; R19; 1	SAN; QR; 1	**SAN**; **R20**; 13	**BAT**; **R21**; 11	SUR; R22; 3	**SUR**; **R23**; 1	PUK; R24; 1	PUK; R25; 2	PUK; R26; 25	**PUK**; **R27**; 1	SYD; R28; 1	SYD; R29; 4										2nd	3168
2017	Triple Eight Race Engineering	88	Holden VF Commodore	ADE; R1; 6	ADE; R2; 6	SYM; R3; 2	**SYM**; **R4**; 3	PHI; R5; 2	PHI; R6; 18	BAR; R7; 3	BAR; R8; 3	WIN; R9; 2	WIN; R10; 2	HID; R11; 4	HID; R12; 2	TOW; R13; 2	TOW; R14; 1	QLD; R15; 20	QLD; R16; 4	SMP; R17; 3	SMP; R18; 1	SAN; QR; 4	SAN; R19; 6	BAT; R20; 20	SUR; R21; 6	SUR; R22; 2	PUK; R23; 4	**PUK**; **R24**; 1	NEW; R25; 21	NEW; R26; 1													1st	3042
2018	Triple Eight Race Engineering	1	Holden ZB Commodore	ADE; R1; 6	ADE; R2; Ret	MEL; R3; 2	**MEL**; **R4**; **1**	MEL; R5; 2	**MEL**; **R6**; **3**	SYM; R7; 1	SYM; R8; 3	PHI; R9; 14	PHI; R10; 9	BAR; R11; 11	BAR; R12; 6	WIN; R13; 17	WIN; R14; 8	HID; R15; 8	HID; R16; 3	**TOW**; **R17**; **1**	TOW; R18; 2	QLD; R19; 4	QLD; R20; 4	**SMP**; **R21**; **2**	BEN; R22; 4	BEN; R23; 1	**SAN**; **QR**; **1**	**SAN**; **R24**; **1**	BAT; R25; 10	SUR; R26; 14	SUR; R27; C	PUK; R28; 5	PUK; R29; 3	NEW; R30; 3	NEW; R31; 3								3rd	3433
2019	Triple Eight Race Engineering	88	Holden ZB Commodore	ADE; R1; 2	ADE; R2; 7	MEL; R3; 8	MEL; R4; 4	MEL; R5; 2	MEL; R6; 3	SYM; R7; 25	SYM; R8; 5	PHI; R9; Ret	PHI; R10; 12	BAR; R11; 4	BAR; R12; 2	WIN; R13; 6	WIN; R14; 3	HID; R15; 5	HID; R16; 5	TOW; R17; 2	TOW; R18; Ret	QLD; R19; 1	QLD; R20; 4	BEN; R21; 11	BEN; R22; 5	PUK; R23; 6	**PUK**; **R24**; **16**	BAT; R25; 4	SUR; R26; 1	SUR; R27; 2	**SAN**; **QR**; **1**	**SAN**; **R28**; **1**	NEW; R29; 8	**NEW**; **R30**; **1**									3rd	3208
2020	Triple Eight Race Engineering	88	Holden ZB Commodore	**ADE**; **R1**; **1**	ADE; R2; 5	MEL; R3; C	**MEL**; **R4**; **C**	MEL; R5; C	MEL; R6; C	SMP1; R7; 3	**SMP1**; **R8**; **2**	SMP1; R9; 3	SMP2; R10; 5	SMP2; R11; 17	SMP2; R12; 8	HID1; R13; 17	HID1; R14; 2	HID1; R15; 1	**HID2**; **R16**; **2**	HID2; R17; 6	HID2; R18; 7	**TOW1**; **R19**; **1**	**TOW1**; **R20**; **1**	TOW1; R21; 3	TOW2; R22; 4	TOW2; R23; 3	TOW2; R24; 2	BEN1; R25; 18	BEN1; R26; 17	BEN1; R27; 3	BEN2; R28; 10	BEN2; R29; 7	BEN2; R30; 3	BAT; R31; Ret									4th	2049
2021	Triple Eight Race Engineering	88	Holden ZB Commodore	BAT1; R1; 7	BAT1; R2; 6	SAN; R3; 3	SAN; R4; 3	SAN; R5; 4	SYM; R6; 2	SYM; R7; 1	SYM; R8; 5	BEN; R9; 6	BEN; R10; 11	BEN; R11; 4	HID; R12; 12	HID; R13; 3	HID; R14; 3	TOW1; R15; 2	**TOW1**; **R16**; **2**	TOW2; R17; 5	**TOW2**; **R18**; **2**	TOW2; R19; 6	SMP1; R20; 9	SMP1; R21; 6	SMP1; R22; 3	SMP2; R23; 2	SMP2; R24; 25	SMP2; R25; 1	SMP3; R26; 4	SMP3; R27; 2	**SMP3**; **R28**; **2**	SMP4; R29; 2	SMP4; R30; C	BAT2; R31; 4									2nd	2719
2022	Triple Eight Race Engineering	88	Holden ZB Commodore	SYD; R1	SYD; R2	SYM; R6	SYM; R7	SYM; R8	MEL; R6	MEL; R7	MEL; R8	MEL; R9	WAN; R10	WAN; R11	WAN; R12	WIN; R13	WIN; R14	WIN; R15	HID; R16	HID; R17	HID; R18	TOW; R19	TOW; R20	BEN; R21	BEN; R22	BEN; R23	SAN; R24	SAN; R25	SAN; R26	PUK; R27	PUK; R28	PUK; R29	BAT; R30; 5	SUR; R31	SUR; R32	ADE; R33	ADE; R34						33rd	222
2023	Triple Eight Race Engineering	88	Chevrolet Camaro ZL1	NEW; R1	NEW; R2	MEL; R3	MEL; R4	MEL; R5	MEL; R6	BAR; R7	BAR; R8	BAR; R9	SYM; R10	SYM; R11	SYM; R12	HID; R13	HID; R14	HID; R15	TOW; R16	TOW; R17	SMP; R18	SMP; R19	BEN; R20	BEN; R21	BEN; R22	SAN; R23; 1	BAT; R24; 23	SUR; R25	SUR; R26	ADE; R27	ADE; R28												30th	372
2024	Triple Eight Race Engineering	88	Chevrolet Camaro ZL1	BAT1; R1	BAT1; R2	MEL; R3	MEL; R4	MEL; R5	MEL; R6	TAU; R7	TAU; R8	BAR; R9	BAR; R10	HID; R11	HID; R12	TOW; R13	TOW; R14	SMP; R15	SMP; R16	SYM; R17	SYM; R18	SAN; R19; 2	BAT2; R20; 2	SUR; R21	SUR; R22	ADE; R23	ADE; R24																27th	552
2025	Triple Eight Race Engineering	88	Chevrolet Camaro ZL1	SYD; R1	SYD; R2	SYD; R3	MEL; R4	MEL; R5	MEL; R6	MEL; R7	TAU; R8	TAU; R9	TAU; R10	SYM; R11	SYM; R12	SYM; R13	BAR; R14	BAR; R15	BAR; R16	HID; R17	HID; R18	HID; R19	TOW; R20	TOW; R21	TOW; R22	QLD; R23	QLD; R24	QLD; R25	BEN; R26; 19	BAT; R27; 6	SUR; R28	SUR; R29	SAN; R30	SAN; R31	ADE; R32	ADE; R33	ADE; R34						36th	265

=== Bathurst 1000 results ===
Year	Team	Car	Co-driver	Position	Laps
2002	Garry Rogers Motorsport	Holden Commodore VX	(Australia) Mark Noske	DNF	72
2003	Garry Rogers Motorsport	Holden Commodore VY	(Australia) Garth Tander	19th	146
2004	Perkins Engineering	Holden Commodore VX	(Australia) Alex Davison	9th	160
2005	Tasman Motorsport	Holden Commodore VZ	(New Zealand) Jason Richards	**2nd**	161
2006	Triple Eight Race Engineering	Ford Falcon BA	(Australia) Craig Lowndes	**1st**	161
2007	Triple Eight Race Engineering	Ford Falcon BF	(Australia) Craig Lowndes	**1st**	161
2008	Triple Eight Race Engineering	Ford Falcon BF	(Australia) Craig Lowndes	**1st**	161
2009	Triple Eight Race Engineering	Ford Falcon FG	(Australia) Craig Lowndes	5th	161
2010	Triple Eight Race Engineering	Holden Commodore VE	(Australia) Steve Owen	**2nd**	161
2011	Triple Eight Race Engineering	Holden Commodore VE	(Australia) Andrew Thompson	21st	160
2012	Triple Eight Race Engineering	Holden Commodore VE	(Australia) Paul Dumbrell	**1st**	161
2013	Triple Eight Race Engineering	Holden Commodore VF	(Australia) Paul Dumbrell	**2nd**	161
2014	Triple Eight Race Engineering	Holden Commodore VF	(Australia) Paul Dumbrell	5th	161
2015	Triple Eight Race Engineering	Holden Commodore VF	(Australia) Paul Dumbrell	18th	161
2016	Triple Eight Race Engineering	Holden Commodore VF	(Australia) Paul Dumbrell	11th	161
2017	Triple Eight Race Engineering	Holden Commodore VF	(Australia) Paul Dumbrell	20th	124
2018	Triple Eight Race Engineering	Holden Commodore ZB	(Australia) Paul Dumbrell	10th	161
2019	Triple Eight Race Engineering	Holden Commodore ZB	(Australia) Craig Lowndes	4th	161
2020	Triple Eight Race Engineering	Holden Commodore ZB	(Australia) Craig Lowndes	DNF	32
2021	Triple Eight Race Engineering	Holden Commodore ZB	(Australia) Craig Lowndes	4th	161
2022	Triple Eight Race Engineering	Holden Commodore ZB	(Australia) Broc Feeney	5th	161
2023	Triple Eight Race Engineering	Chevrolet Camaro Mk.6	(Australia) Broc Feeney	23rd	142
2024	Triple Eight Race Engineering	Chevrolet Camaro Mk.6	(Australia) Broc Feeney	**2nd**	161
2025	Triple Eight Race Engineering	Chevrolet Camaro Mk.6	(Australia) Broc Feeney	6th	161

=== Complete Bathurst 12 Hour results ===
Year	Team	Co-drivers	Car	Class	Laps	Pos.	Class pos.
2017	(Australia) Maranello Motorsport	(Finland) Toni Vilander (Australia) Craig Lowndes	Ferrari 488 GT3	AP	290	**1st**	**1st**
2018	(Australia) Scott Taylor Motorsport (United States) Team SunEnergy1 Racing	(Australia) Kenny Habul (Italy) Raffaele Marciello (France) Tristan Vautier	Mercedes-AMG GT3	APP	271	**2nd**	**2nd**
2019	(Australia) Triple Eight Race Engineering	(Australia) Craig Lowndes (New Zealand) Shane van Gisbergen	Mercedes-AMG GT3	APP	312	4th	4th
2020	(Australia) Triple Eight Race Engineering	(New Zealand) Shane van Gisbergen (Germany) Maximilian Götz	Mercedes-AMG GT3 Evo	PRO	314	**3rd**	**3rd**
2023	(Australia) Triple Eight Race Engineering	(New Zealand) Richie Stanaway (Malaysia) Prince Jeffri Ibrahim	Mercedes-AMG GT3 Evo	PRO-AM	319	10th	**3rd**
2024	(Australia) Triple Eight Race Engineering	(Australia) Jordan Love (Malaysia) Prince Jeffri Ibrahim	Mercedes-AMG GT3 Evo	PRO-AM	274	11th	**3rd**

== Bibliography ==
- West, Luke (20 August 2021). The Immortals of Australian Motor Racing: The Local Heroes (Part of the 7-volume comprehensive sports collection). Immortals of Australian Sport (7-book series). Gelding Street Press. ISBN 978-1-925946-98-7.

Sporting positions
Preceded by Marcos Ambrose	Winner of the Clipsal 500; 2006	Succeeded by Rick Kelly
Preceded by Rick Kelly	Winner of the Clipsal 500; 2008-2009	Succeeded by Garth Tander
Preceded by Garth Tander	Winner of the Clipsal 500; 2011	Succeeded by Will Davison
Preceded by Mark Skaife; Todd Kelly	Winner of the Bathurst 1000; 2006, 2007 & 2008 (with Craig Lowndes)	Succeeded by Garth Tander; Will Davison
Preceded by Garth Tander; Nick Percat	Winner of the Bathurst 1000; 2012 (with Paul Dumbrell)	Succeeded by Mark Winterbottom; Steven Richards
Preceded by Garth Tander	Winner of the V8 Supercar Championship Series; 2008 & 2009	Succeeded by James Courtney
Preceded by James Courtney	Winner of the International V8 Supercars Championship; 2011, 2012, 2013 & 2014	Succeeded by Mark Winterbottom
Preceded by Craig Lowndes; Warren Luff	Winner of the V8 Supercars Endurance Cup; 2014 (with Paul Dumbrell)	Succeeded by Garth Tander; Warren Luff
Preceded by Álvaro Parente; Shane van Gisbergen; Jonathon Webb	Winner of the Bathurst 12 Hour; 2017 (with Craig Lowndes & Toni Vilander)	Succeeded by Robin Frijns; Stuart Leonard; Dries Vanthoor
Preceded by Shane van Gisbergen	Winner of the Supercars Championship; 2017	Succeeded by Scott McLaughlin
Preceded by Craig Lowndes; Steven Richards	Winner of the Pirtek Enduro Cup; 2019 (with Craig Lowndes)	Succeeded by incumbent
Awards and achievements
Preceded by Craig Lowndes	Barry Sheene Medal; 2007–2008	Succeeded by Will Davison
Preceded by Inaugural	Larry Perkins Trophy; 2018	Succeeded by Chaz Mostert
Preceded by Scott McLaughlin	Barry Sheene Medal; 2021	Succeeded by Lee Holdsworth
Records
Preceded by Craig Lowndes; 49 wins (1996 – present)	Most ATCC round wins 50 (2002 – present), 50th win at the 2018 Melbourne 400	Succeeded by incumbent
Preceded by Craig Lowndes; 105 wins (1996 – present)	Most ATCC race wins 114 (2002 – present), 106th win at the 2017 Red Rooster Sydney SuperSprint	Succeeded by incumbent
