= Australia's Greatest Athlete season 1 =

Australia's Greatest Athlete
- Season 1
- No. of episodes: 8

Release
- Original network: Nine Network

Season chronology
- Next → Season 2

The first season of Australia's Greatest Athlete was broadcast on the Nine Network and hosted by Andrew Voss and Michael Slater, with Ricky Ponting as a sideline commentator. It was sponsored by Rexona, which had naming rights to the show.

== Participants ==
- Joel Griffiths - Griffiths is an A-League soccer player, currently on loan to Chinese domestic football (soccer) side Beijing Guoan. He was 29 years old, 77 kilograms and 181 centimeters tall. The charity he supported is Ronald McDonald House.
- Jamie Whincup - Whincup is one of Australia's leading Supercars drivers. He is considered an underdog due to the perception that he is involved in the least athletic sport. He was 25 years old, 78 kilograms and 178 centimeters tall. The charity he supported is the Surf Life Saving Foundation.
- Steve Hooker - Hooker is a 2008 Beijing Olympic Games gold medalist in pole vaulting, the first male Australian track and field competitor to win gold since 1968. He was 26 years old, 85 kilograms and 188 centimeters tall.
- Brett Deledio - Deledio plays in the AFL with the Richmond Tigers. Multi-skilled, Brett turned down a spot in the Victorian youth cricket team in his younger years to focus on Australian Rules Football. He was 21 years old, 87 kilograms and 189 centimeters tall. The charity he supported is the Marsh Foundation.
- Lote Tuqiri - Tuquiri played for the Wallabies at the time of the show. Previously he had played for the Brisbane Broncos, making him the only contestant to play professionally in two football codes. He was 29 years old, 103 kilograms and 191 centimeters tall. The charity he supported is the RSPCA.
- Ky Hurst - Hurst is one of Australia's greatest Ironmen. He is the only man to win seven Ironman titles. He was 27 years old, 87 kilograms and is 182 centimeters tall. The charity he supported is the Kids Help Line.
- Billy Slater - Slater is a star of the NRL, playing with the Melbourne Storm, Queensland Maroons and Australia. He was 25 years of age, 87 kilograms and 179 centimeters tall. The charity he is supporting is the Royal Flying Doctor Service.
- Andrew Symonds - Symonds is one of Australia's more popular and controversial cricketers. Considered an all-rounder, Symonds was playing for both Australia's Test and One-Day teams. He was 33 years old, 94 kilograms and 187 centimeters tall. Symonds is also supporting the Royal Flying Doctor Service.

== Challenges and results ==
=== Episode 1 ===
- Golf Challenge (1st- Jamie Whincup, Equal 2nd- Billy Slater, Equal 2nd- Lote Tuqiri)
- Cricket Challenge (1st- Andrew Symonds, 2nd- Brett Deledio, 3rd- Steve Hooker)

=== Episode 2 ===
- Basketball Challenge (1st- Steve Hooker, 2nd- Billy Slater, 3rd- Brett Deledio)
- Mini Ironman Challenge (1st- Ky Hurst, 2nd- Billy Slater, 3rd- Jamie Whincup)

=== Episode 3 ===
- 1-on-1 Try Challenge (1st- Billy Slater, 2nd- Steve Hooker, 3rd- Andrew Symonds)
- Bench Press (1st- Brett Deledio, 2nd- Billy Slater, 3rd- Joel Griffiths)

=== Episode 4 ===
- 40 meter beach sprint (1st- Steve Hooker, 2nd- Billy Slater, 3rd- Brett Deledio)
- Dune Buggy Challenge (1st- Jamie Whincup, 2nd- Ky Hurst, 3rd- Lote Tuqiri)

=== Episode 5 ===
- Rock Climbing Challenge (1st- Billy Slater, 2nd- Steve Hooker, 3rd- Jamie Whincup)
- High Ball Challenge (1st- Billy Slater, 2nd- Brett Deledio, 3rd- Andrew Symonds)

=== Episode 6 ===
- AFL kicking challenge (1st- Andrew symonds, 2nd- Billy Slater, Equal 3rd- Brett Deledio, Lote Tuqiri and Jamie Whincup)
- Jet Ski Challenge (1st- Jamie Whincup, 2nd- Ky Hurst, 3rd- Billy Slater)

=== Episode 7 ===
- Soccer Penalty Kick Challenge (1st- Joel Griffiths, 2nd- Lote Tuqiri, Equal 3rd- Brett Deledio, Jamie Whincup and Billy Slater)
- Boxing Challenge (1st- Lote Tuqiri, 2nd- Andrew Symonds, 3rd- Brett Deledio)

=== Episode 8 ===
- Multi-Sport Challenge (1st- Ky Hurst, 2nd- Jamie Whincup, 3rd- Billy Slater)

== Final results ==
Position	Athlete	Points
1st	Billy Slater	1085
2nd	Brett Deledio	1070
3rd	Jamie Whincup	1050
4th	Steve Hooker	1025
5th	Andrew Symonds	1020
6th	Lote Tuqiri	975
7th	Ky Hurst	960
8th	Joel Griffiths	920

== Trivia ==
- Andrew Symonds was the oldest athlete
- Billy Slater claimed 11 podium finishes out of the 15 events
- Every athlete won at least one challenge
