= Billy Slater =

Australia international rugby league footballer

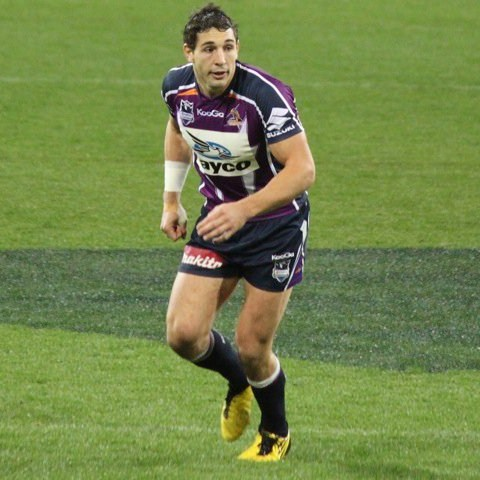

Personal information
- Full name: William Slater
- Born: 18 June 1983 (age 43) Nambour, Queensland, Australia
- Height: 178 cm (5 ft 10 in)
- Weight: 88 kg (13 st 12 lb)

Playing information
- Position: Fullback
Club
Years	Team	Pld	T	G	FG	P
2003–18	Melbourne Storm	319	190	0	0	760
Representative
Years	Team	Pld	T	G	FG	P
2004–18	Queensland	31	12	0	0	48
2008–17	Australia	30	27	0	0	108

Coaching information
Representative
Years	Team	Gms	W	D	L	W%
2022–26	Queensland	15	8	0	7	53
- Source: As of 22 November 2026

William Slater (born 18 June 1983), commonly known as Billy Slater, is an Australian rugby league coach and former professional player. Widely regarded as one of the greatest fullbacks in rugby league history, Slater played his entire National Rugby League (NRL) career with the Melbourne Storm, making 319 appearances and scoring 190 tries. He holds the club record for most tries and the NRL record for most tries scored by a fullback. Renowned for his speed, attacking instincts, positional awareness and support play, he helped redefine the attacking role of the modern fullback. His individual honours include the Dally M Medal in 2011, two Clive Churchill Medals and the 2008 Golden Boot Award as the world's best player.

Slater made his first-grade debut for Melbourne in 2003 and became a central figure in the club's success during the following 16 seasons. He played in seven NRL grand finals and won the Clive Churchill Medal as grand final player of the match in 2009 and 2017. Melbourne's 2007 and 2009 premierships were subsequently stripped following salary cap breaches, while Slater was a member of the club's premiership-winning teams in 2012 and 2017. His 190 tries for Melbourne rank among the highest totals in Australian first-grade rugby league history.

At representative level, Slater played 31 matches for Queensland in the State of Origin series between 2004 and 2018, forming part of the Maroons' unprecedented eight-consecutive-series winning streak from 2006 to 2013. He also represented the Australian national team, scoring 30 tries in 30 Test appearances. At the 2008 Rugby League World Cup, he was the tournament's leading try-scorer and was named player of the tournament before receiving the Golden Boot Award. He was also named Dally M Player of the Year in 2011 and was recognised as one of the leading players of his generation.

Following his retirement as a player in 2018, Slater became head coach of Queensland ahead of the 2022 State of Origin series. He led the Maroons to series victories in 2022, 2023 and 2025, concluding his tenure after the 2026 series.

== Background ==
Slater was born in Nambour, Queensland, Australia in 1983. He began playing rugby league football for the Brothers club in Innisfail, Queensland. A North Queensland Cowboys fan growing up, he never made a representative side with the club. At sixteen years of age, Slater left school at Innisfail State High School and decided to follow his personal passion for thoroughbred racing, working initially in Sydney for 6 months as a roustabout for racehorse trainer Gai Waterhouse.

== Playing career ==
In 2001, Slater had moved to Brisbane and played for Melbourne Storm feeder club Norths Devils in their Colts (under-18s) team. He would win the Colt's Best Back award at the end of the season, also making his Queensland Cup debut with the Devils during that season, playing two matches. In August he signed a development contract with the Melbourne Storm and trained with the NRL squad during part of the preseason for the 2002 NRL season. With future Storm teammate Cooper Cronk, he was part of the Devils team that lost the 2001 Colts competition grand final 24–22 against the Redcliffe Dolphins, scoring two tries in the match.

Slater would continue with the Norths Devils in 2002, scoring 15 tries at Queensland Cup level to be the club's leading tryscorer. He was a late call up to the Queensland Residents team, playing on the wing against the Queensland Emerging Origin squad in October 2002.

=== 2003 ===
Slater started playing for the Melbourne Storm in 2003. In Round 1 of the 2003 NRL season, Slater made his first-grade NRL debut for the Melbourne Storm against the Cronulla-Sutherland Sharks at Remondis Stadium. Slater started on the wing and scored a try in Melbourne's 36–32 win after overcoming a 22–0 deficit early in the first half. In Slater's next match in Round 2 against the Penrith Panthers, Slater played his first match for the Storm at fullback, scoring 2 tries in the Storm's 42–16 win at Olympic Park. From Rounds 4–8, Slater played in the centre position before moving back to fullback in Round 10 against the Brisbane Broncos in the Storms 36–16 loss at Queensland Sport and Athletics Centre. Slater played the rest of the year at fullback. After a stellar début season saw him crowned Dally M Rookie of the Year (although the awards that year were cancelled in protest), Slater was the Storm's highest try scorer in the 2003 NRL season with 19 tries in their 26 matches.

=== 2004 ===
Slater made his debut on the wing for Queensland in game one of the 2004 State of Origin series. Slater had a quiet but solid first game in QLD's 9–8 loss at ANZ Stadium. Slater retained his spot on the team for the second game of the series at Suncorp Stadium. In game two, just days shy of his 21st birthday, Slater was named man of the match after scoring two tries. His second try is considered one of the great individual Origin tries. Trailing 12–10, Slater latched onto a grubber kick from Darren Lockyer, chip-kicked the ball over Blues fullback Anthony Minichiello, regathering the ball and scoring in QLD's 22–18 win. Slater scored a try in the decider but could not stop a Brad Fittler inspired New South Wales side from clinching the series in QLD's 36–14 loss. Slater's club form helped his team finish 6th on the ladder, defeating the Brisbane Broncos 31–14 at Suncorp Stadium in the first game of the finals before succumbing to eventual premiers the Canterbury-Bankstown Bulldogs 43–18 at SFS. Slater played 22 matches and scored 14 tries for the Storm in the 2004 NRL season. He was named in the Kangaroo squad to tour Europe but injury prevented him from joining in the tour.

=== 2005 ===
Slater once again impressed in his third NRL season. Once again he was picked for the Queensland State of Origin team, this time at his preferred position of fullback. Slater returned for the second game in Sydney which saw the return of Andrew Johns, who spearheaded a New South Wales victory. Despite losing the match 32–22, Slater took advantage of a knock-on from the Blues Anthony Minichiello to score a length of the field try during the match. Slater was dumped from the Queensland side for the deciding third game in Brisbane which led to outrage from some Maroons fans. With injuries and suspensions, Slater had to wait three years for another chance at State of Origin. Slater continued his brilliant form throughout 2005, topping the try scoring charts with 20 tries in 21 matches for the Storm. Melbourne once again finished 6th in the league and defeated the Brisbane Broncos 24–18 at Suncorp Stadium in the first game of the finals before missing the Storms 24–16 season ending loss succumbing to an in-form North Queensland Cowboys team at SFS.

=== 2006 ===
Slater had a less successful 2006 season. Slater was suspended in Round 4 for seven matches for kicking Wests Tigers prop John Skandalis, but also scored two tries in the match. Injuries and suspensions kept Slater out of contention for a spot in the Queensland team in 2006. In his comeback game in Round 13 against the Sydney Roosters in the Storms 20–16 win at Olympic Park, Slater only played 25 minutes of the second half on the wing and was later found guilty of using a dangerous throw on Roosters centre Ryan Cross. Slater was suspended for 2 matches. After Slater's second suspension, Melbourne Storm coach Craig Bellamy decided to give Slater some warm up matches for his comeback into first grade with both North Sydney Bears (Melbourne's feeder club in the NSWRL Premier League) and Norths Devils (Melbourne's feeder club in the Queensland Cup). Slater made his NRL comeback in Round 18 playing his preferred fullback position when the Storm defeated the Brisbane Broncos 10–4 at Olympic Park. In Round 22 against the Wests Tigers in the Storms 46–4 win at Olympic Park, Slater was given a two match suspension for a late forearm, which was his third suspension for the season. Slater came back to the main line-up in Round 25 against the Canberra Raiders in the Storms 22–18 win at Canberra Stadium. A few weeks later, after having claimed the minor premiership the Storm again met the Brisbane Broncos, this time in the 2006 NRL Grand Final. It was Slater's first and he played at fullback in what was Melbourne's first grand final loss after succumbing 15–8 to a Broncos team in Melbourne player Scott Hill farewell NRL match before moving to the ESL. Slater played in 15 matches and scored 5 tries for the Storm in the 2006 NRL season.

=== 2007 ===
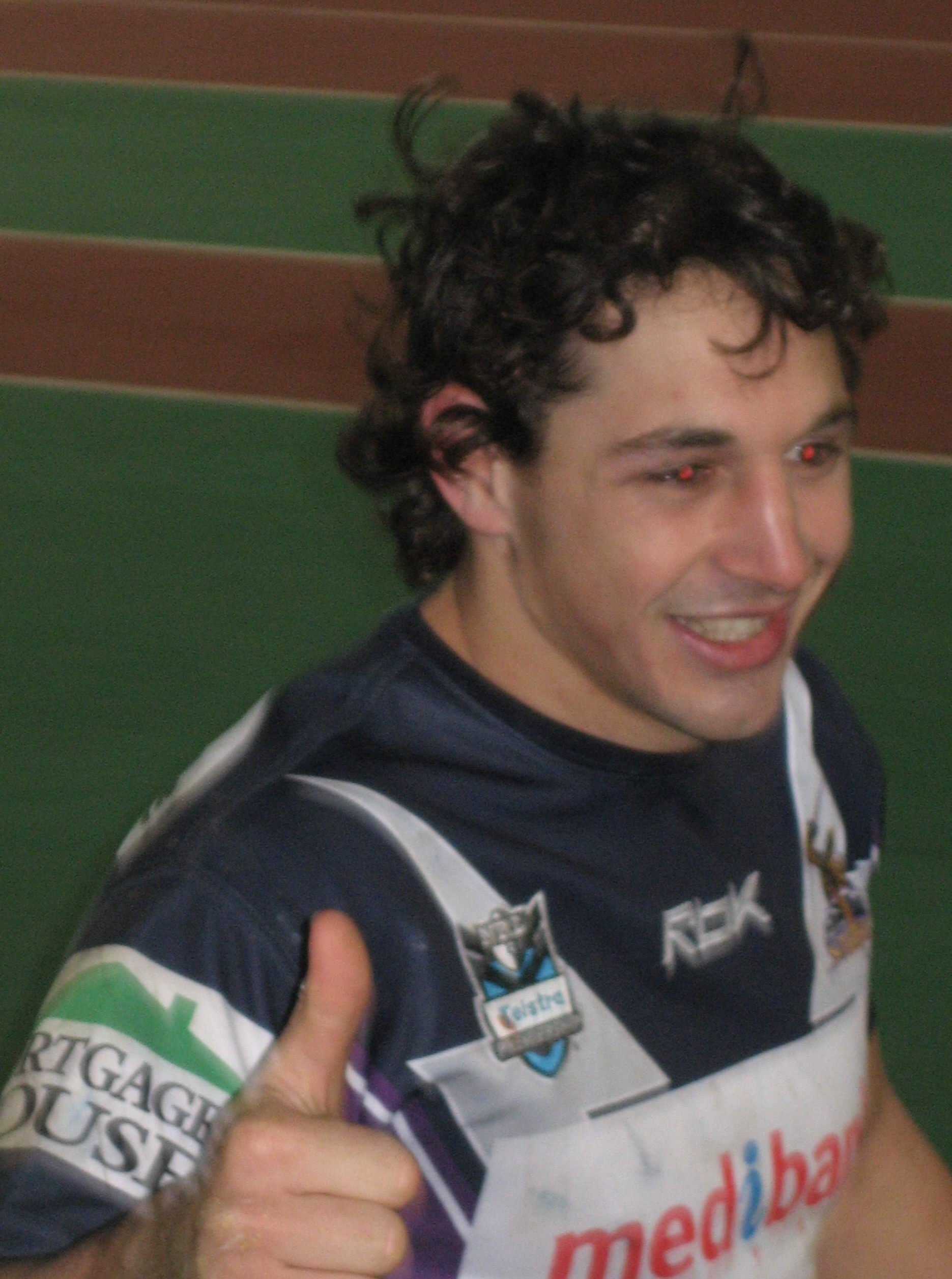
Slater while playing for Melbourne in 2007.

Slater had a quiet start to the 2007 season. In Round 8, he suffered a badly broken cheekbone against the Manly-Warringah Sea Eagles when he tried to charge down former teammate Matt Orford's kick, and collided with teammate Sam Tagataese in Melbourne's 13–12 loss at Brookvale Oval. On his return from injury in Round 17, Slater scored 8 tries from 9 appearances and became a vital cog in the back line of the Storm, setting up over 20 tries during the season. In Round 21 against the Cronulla-Sutherland Sharks at Remondis Stadium, Slater played his 100th NRL career match in the Storms 17–16 win. Slater was part of the Melbourne Storm 2007 NRL Grand Final winning team at Fullback, defeating the Manly-Warringah Sea Eagles 34–8, which was later stripped from them for cheating the salary cap. Slater played in 23 matches and scored 12 tries for the Storm in the 2007 NRL season. Slater won the Storms Back of the Year Award. In the post season Slater was named at Fullback in the Melbourne Storm Team of the Decade.

=== 2008 ===
Slater's start to the 2008 season can be described as nothing short of sensational. He scored 3 tries in Melbourne's 32–18 Round 1 win at Etihad Stadium, one at SFS in Round 3, a 10–6 loss to the Sydney Roosters and two at Olympic Park in Melbourne's 26–4 win over the Manly-Warringah Sea Eagles. After his start to the season, Slater garnered praise from league experts such as Laurie Daley and Andrew Johns as being the best player in the game. Slater's form was rewarded when he was selected at fullback for the Australian national team in the Centenary Test against New Zealand, displacing the incumbent Brett Stewart. Slater had a modest game in attack for Australia but proved his worth by making numerous try-saving tackles in Australia's 28–12 victory at SCG. Two weeks later, Slater was selected to once again represent Queensland in the 2008 State of Origin series, this time displacing incumbent, Karmichael Hunt from fullback to five-eighth, Slater had a mixed performance for Queensland throwing a few loose passes despite running over 220 metres and making a line break that nearly resulted in a try to Greg Inglis. Queensland eventually lost, 18–10. Slater returned for Game 2 but was dropped to the interchange bench before replacing Karmichael Hunt 30 minutes into the match at ANZ Stadium. In Game 2 Slater played off the interchange bench in QLD's 30–0 win in Brisbane. In Game 3, Slater once again started from the interchange bench with Karmichael Hunt starting at fullback. A broken arm to Scott Prince at the 17-minute mark forced Slater to fullback with Karmichael Hunt switching to five eighth. Slater broke the line with his first touch and kick return of the game. He was excellent under the high ball, thwarting many attacking kicks. With just 10 minutes to go, Johnathan Thurston broke the New South Wales line, drawing in the fullback before passing the ball to Slater who ran the remaining 30 metres to score the match-winning try and a 16–10 victory. It was Slater's first series win for Queensland. In Round 19, Slater was involved in an all-in brawl in a match against the St George Illawarra Dragons in the Storms 26–0 win at Olympic Park. He was sin-binned for throwing several punches at winger, Jason Nightingale. He had a two-match suspension downgraded to one match after claiming Nightingale had provoked him with several head-butts throughout the match.

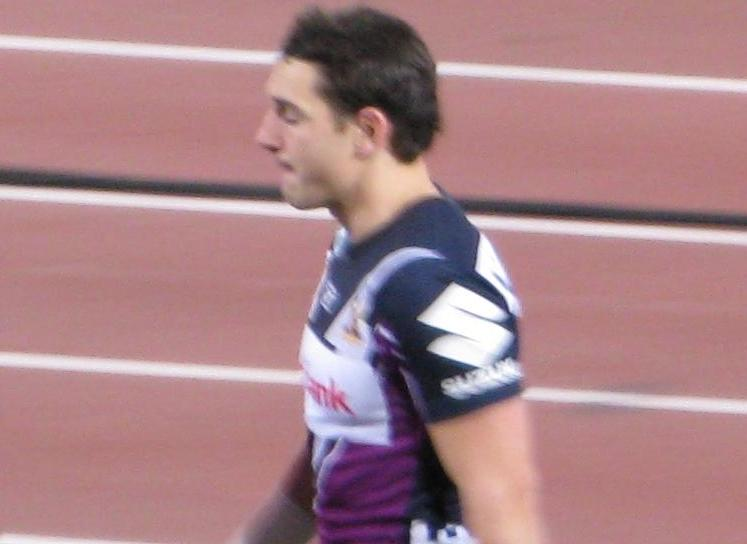
Slater playing for the Storm in August 2008.

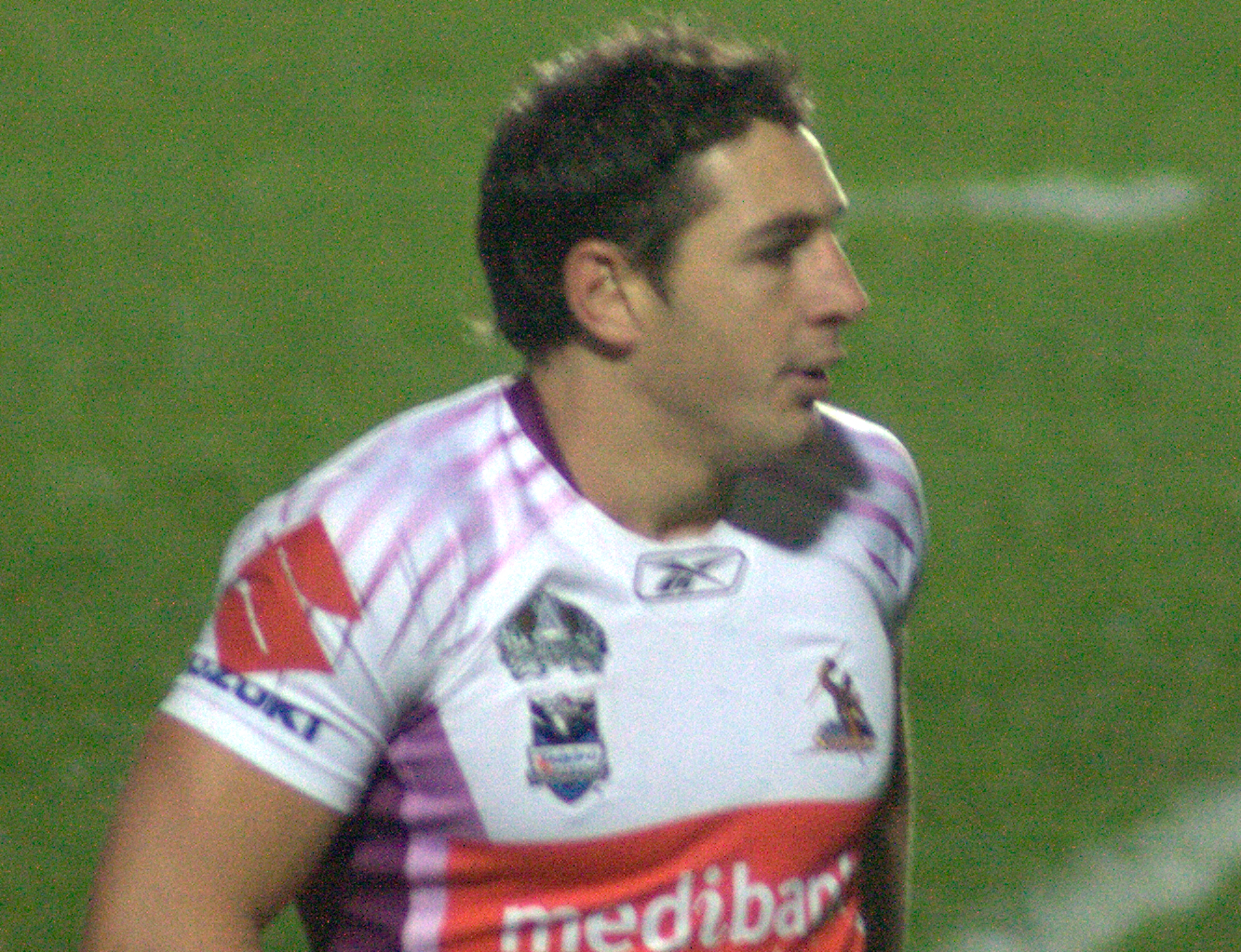
Slater playing for Melbourne in 2008

In August 2008, Slater was named in the preliminary 46-man Kangaroos squad for the 2008 World Cup. In September 2008; Slater narrowly missed out on the Dally M Medal, Player of the Year, finishing 2 points behind the Sea Eagles Matt Orford. The one-week suspension in Round 19 deducted 3 points from Slater's tally, which would have won him the medal. Days after playing in the 2008 NRL Grand Final 40–0 defeat the Manly-Warringah Sea Eagles, Slater was named the Melbourne club's Player of the Year. Slater played in 24 matches and scored 14 tries for the Storm in the 2008 NRL season. Slater capped off a brilliant year by winning the Rugby League World Golden Boot Award as the best player in the world. In 2008, he also received the Rugby League International Federation's International Player of the Year award.

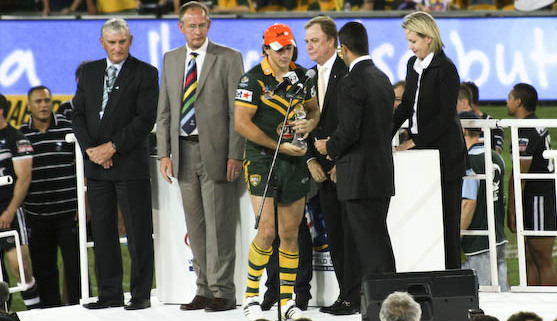
Slater after playing for Australia in the 2008 World Cup final.

In October 2008, Slater was selected in the final 24-man Australian squad but hesitated playing since he and his wife were expecting their first child. Slater went on to play fullback for Australia in the 2008 World Cup, scoring hat-tricks in matches against England (52–4 win at Etihad) & Fiji (52–0 win at the Sydney Football Stadium). Slater won the Man of the match twice in tournament for his performance in both games. About midway through the second half of the World Cup final Slater, who had set up Australia's first two tries, made a grave misjudgement, Slater threw a wild pass back in field after attempting to go the short side from a kick return and it was snapped up by Benji Marshall for a gift four-pointer. Although Melbourne teammate Greg Inglis bought them back within 2 points with a try, a penalty try, courtesy of a Joel Monaghan infringement, ruled out any possible comeback. Despite his costly error and Australia losing the game 34–20 to New Zealand, Slater was named Player of the Tournament following the World Cup final in Brisbane. Slater was also the competition's top tryscorer with 7 tries.

=== 2009 ===
Slater was selected for Australia in the 2009 Anzac Test match at fullback against New Zealand at Suncorp Stadium in the Kangaroos' 38–10 redemption win over the Kiwis. In April 2009, he was named in the preliminary 25-man squad to represent Queensland in the opening State of Origin match for 2009, and was subsequently picked at fullback for the opening State of Origin match. Slater was the first try scorer in the 2009 State of Origin Series scoring in Queensland's 28–18 win in Sydney. Slater played in the other 2 matches in the Queensland's 2009 winning State of Origin team. In Round 22 against the North Queensland Cowboys at Olympic Park, Slater played 150th NRL career match in the Storms 20–8 win. Melbourne finished the season 4th on the NRL table and avenged their 2008 Grand Final loss to Manly by defeating them 40–12 in the first week of the finals at Etihad Stadium. Slater's four try haul earned him man of the match honours. Slater notched up his 100th NRL career try in Melbourne's 40–10 victory over the Brisbane Broncos in the preliminary final at Etihad Stadium, becoming only the second Melbourne player to do so after Matt Geyer.

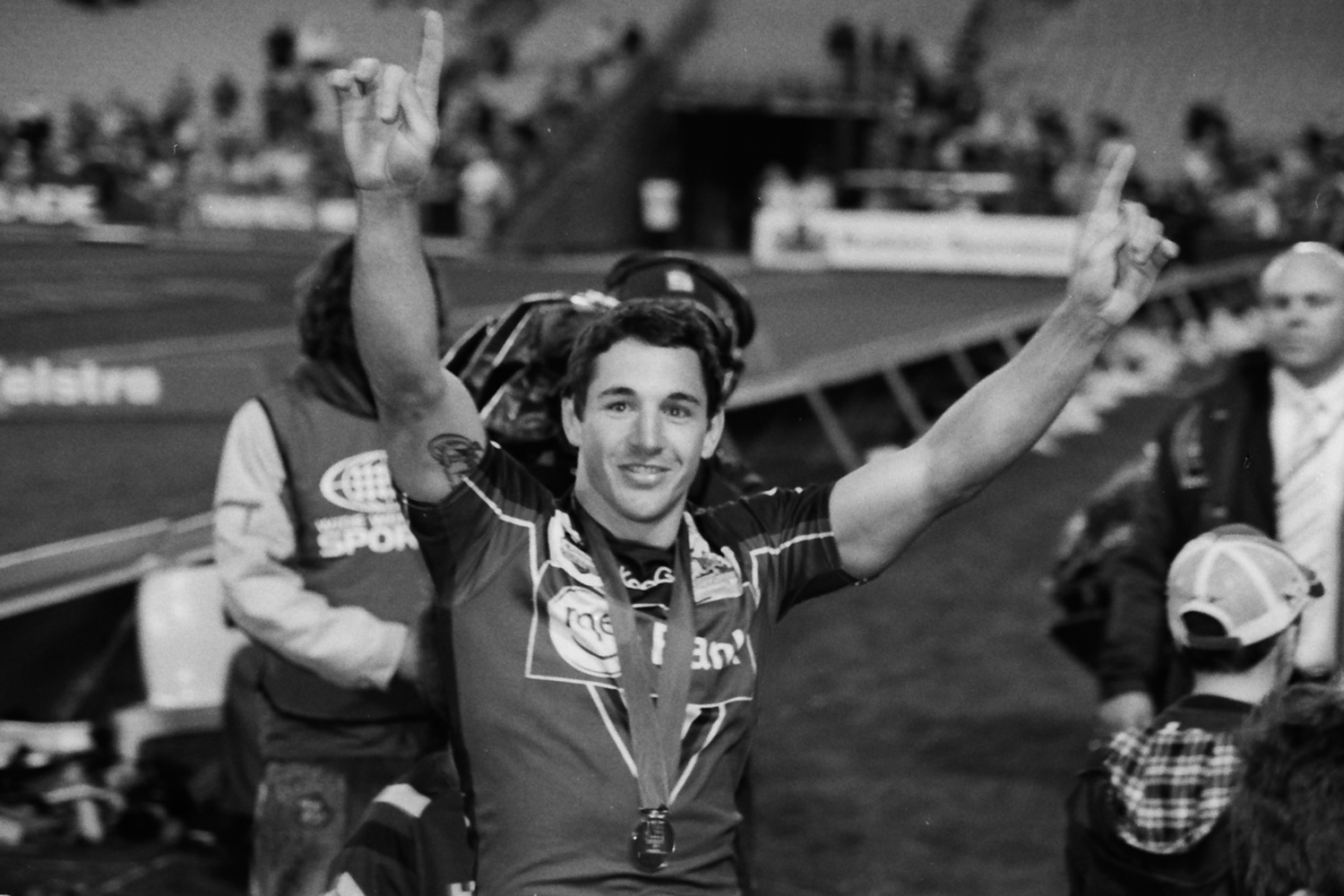
Slater after the 2009 NRL Grand Final.

In the next week, the Grand Final was won by the Melbourne Storm over the Parramatta Eels 23–16. Again this was also stripped from Melbourne for systematic salary cap cheating. Slater scored a try and was judged best on ground, earning the Clive Churchill Medal. Slater was named the Storms highest tryscorer in the 2009 NRL season with 18 tries in 26 matches. The following week Slater was named Melbourne's Player of the Year making it the second consecutive year he won the award. During the off-season he was given the first 'Player of the Finals' award, presented by the Rugby League Writers' Association.

Slater topped off the season with selection for Australia in the 2009 Four Nations tournament in Europe. Slater played in the first two matches against New Zealand and then England. Slater scored three tries in Australia's 46–16 win over England in the final and also acrobatically tapped the ball back infield setting up a try for teammate, Cameron Smith.

=== 2010 ===
For the 2010 Anzac Test, Slater was selected to play for Australia at fullback in their 12–8 victory against New Zealand at AAMI Park. Despite Melbourne being stripped of their 2007 and 2009 premierships due to the discovery of a salary cap breach, Slater was allowed to keep his Clive Churchill Medal. Slater was also involved in Queensland's 3–0 whitewash in the 2010 State of Origin series and received the Wally Lewis Medal for player of the series. In the third match, he saved a certain try, before scoring the match-turning and winning try with five minutes remaining in Queensland's 23–18 win in Sydney. Slater played in 22 matches and scored 10 tries in the Storms drama filled 2010 NRL season in which they were stripped all premiership points, and barred from collecting anymore (Including ones earned from byes) on 22 April as a result of their salary cap breach In the post season, Slater was included in the Australian 2010 Four Nations squad. Slater scored 3 tries in 3 matches, including scoring a try in the Kangaroos 16–12 Four Nations Final match loss to New Zealand at Suncorp Stadium.

=== 2011 ===
In Round 2 against the Gold Coast Titans at AAMI Park the Storms 40–12 win, Slater scored two where he broke the record for the number of tries scored for Melbourne Storm with 114 tries, previously held by Matt Geyer with 113 tries. For the 2011 Anzac Test, Slater was selected to play for Australia at fullback, scoring two tries in the Kangaroos 20–10 victory against New Zealand at Cbus Super Stadium. Slater played in all three 2011 State of Origin matches, as fullback for the Queensland Maroons. Slater scored in the last 10 minutes of Game 1 in the Queensland's 16–12 win in Brisbane, and scored in the last 15 minutes of Game 3 in QLD's 34–24 series winning match in Brisbane. In Round 24 against the St George Illawarra Dragons at AAMI Park, Slater played his 200th NRL career match in the Storms 8–6 win. The Melbourne Storm won the minor premiership, but were defeated by the New Zealand Warriors 20–12 in the Preliminary Final at AAMI Park, ending Slater's season. Slater was awarded the 2011 Dally M Medal for best and fairest player of the year in the NRL. Following the awarding of the Dally M Medal, there was commentary about Slater's progress. Sports reporters Ray Warren said that he "didn't think Slater was as good a player as he had been in the past", while Andrew Johns labelled Slater as "the best fullback he has seen". After playing in 24 matches, Slater was the Storms joint highest tryscorer with 12 tries alongside Cooper Cronk and Matt Duffie in the 2011 NRL season. On 3 October, Slater was selected for the Australian Kangaroos, to play as fullback in the 2011 Rugby League Four Nations tournament. While on tour, Slater was named the Rugby League International Federation's International Player of the Year for the second time. Slater suffered a collarbone injury and was ruled out of the tournament after Australia's 36–20 win over England at Wembley Stadium. Slater played in 3 matches of the series.

=== 2012 ===
Slater started the year scoring 9 tries in 5 games, including 2 tries per game in the opening 4 rounds of the season.

For the Anzac Test, Slater was selected to play at fullback in the Kangaroos 20–12 victory against New Zealand at Eden Park. Slater was Queensland's fullback for Games 1 and 2 of the 2012 State of Origin series which saw the Maroons record winning streak extend to seven series. Slater finished the 2012 NRL season with him scoring 16 tries in 21 matches for the Storm, which made him the highest fullback try scorer in the NRL with 140 tries, going past previous holder Rhys Wesser with 129. Slater scored a try in Melbourne's 14–4 premiership victory over Canterbury-Bankstown Bulldogs, where Slater was bitten in the ear by James Graham during a scuffle. Slater was selected at fullback for the Kangaroos October Test against New Zealand at 1300SMILES Stadium. The Kangaroos won the match 18–10.

An established ambassador for Adidas, in 2012 Slater appeared as part of a promotional campaign for their F50 adizero III boots alongside Dale Thomas of Aussie Rules and European football (soccer) player David Villa.

=== 2013 ===
Slater scored the first try in Melbourne's 2013 World Club Challenge 18–14 win over Leeds Rhinos. In the 2013 Anzac Test, Slater played at fullback for Australia in the Kangaroos' 32–12 victory against New Zealand at Canberra Stadium. Slater played all three games of the 2013 State of Origin series in which Queensland extended their record for consecutive series victories to eight. In Round 21 against the Canberra Raiders at Canberra Stadium, Slater also became the 8th player in history of the League to score 150 tries, Slater scoring 2 tries in the Storms 68–4 win. Slater was the Storm's highest tryscorer in the 2013 NRL season with 18 tries in 24 matches. In the post season, Slater was chosen in Australian 24-man squad for the 2013 World Cup which Australia won the Final against New Zealand 34–2 at Old Trafford, where Slater scored 2 tries. Slater played in 4 matches and scored 4 tries in the tournament.

=== 2014 ===
In Round 2 against the Penrith Panthers, Slater reached a milestone of having played 250 games for Melbourne Storm in the 18–17 win at AAMI Park. In the 2014 Anzac Test, Slater played at fullback for Australia in the Kangaroos' 30–18 victory against New Zealand at SFS. Slater played all three games of the 2014 State of Origin series in which Queensland lost the series 2–1, the first series the NSW Blues won since the 2005 series. In Round 22 against the Newcastle Knights in the Storms 32–30 loss at Hunter Stadium, Slater eclipsed Andrew Ettingshausen tryscoring record with 166 tries, Slater now currently being third in the highest tryscorer ranks. Slater finished the Storm's 2014 NRL season with him playing in 22 matches and scoring 12 tries. On 9 September 2014, Slater was selected for the Australia Kangaroos 2014 Four Nations train on squad but withdrew due to injury.

=== 2015 ===
Slater started the 2015 season, playing featuring in the first 5 rounds of the season. He picked up a shoulder injury in the Storm's 30–14 home game win over the Warriors, which resulted him missing the next 4 weeks of action; including the Kangaroos' Annual Trans-Tasman ANZAC Test match clash to the Kiwis, with Greg Inglis filling his Fullback position. He returned to action in round 8, producing a strong 80-minutes man-of-the-match performance against the Parramatta Eels, scoring 2 tries and producing a try-saving tackle on Semi Radradra.

Carrying a shoulder injury (not 100% fully recovered) from the Storm's Round 5 game (in April) that resulted him being ruled out the Trans-Tasman ANZAC Test, Slater featured for Queensland in Game 1 and Game 2 of the 2015 State of Origin series. After the Storms' Round 10 match against the South Sydney Rabbitohs in the 16–12 win at AAMI Park and following game 2 of the 2015 State of Origin series at the Melbourne Cricket Ground, Slater was ruled out of Origin Game 3 (the decider) and for the rest of the 2015 NRL season due to him having surgery on his troublesome injured shoulder (he originally injured in April, in Round 5). Slater's incumbent fullback position was filled by Greg Inglis for Queensland for game 3 of the Origin Decider, while Cameron Munster who had a stellar year for the Storm filled his Fullback position for the Storm. Slater finished the season with him only playing in 7 matches and scoring 2 tries for the Storm.

=== 2016 ===
After starting round 1 of the 2016 NRL season playing 80-minutes and producing an outstanding performance; Slater was a late withdrawn from the Storm's round 2 clash against the Titans and after having an arthroscope, he was then later again ruled out for 6–8 months as well as for the season; after pulling up sore following the Storm's victory over the Dragons. With speculations surrounding his playing future following that shoulder reconstruction, his Melbourne Storm Fullback role was filled again by Cameron Munster.

During his time on the sideline, his Fullback positions was filled by Darius Boyd for both Australia (during the International Trans-Tasman ANZAC Test match, which was played at Newcastle's Hunter Stadium) and Queensland (for the State of Origin Series). Despite still being out of action, he missed being part of Queensland's State of Origin victorious campaign although he worked closely with new Maroons coach Kevin Walters as a consultant during the 2016 State of Origin series period, assisting him in coaching and working with the backs, as well as working closely with the team.

Slater also missed being part of Storm's Grand Final home-away-from-home clash to the Cronulla Sharks and Australia's successful Four Nations campaign, as well as missing the first ever Perth International Rugby League Trans-Tasman Test match.

At the end of the 2016 season, Slater was awarded (and received) the Peter Jackson Medal for his outstanding contribution in assisting Kevin Walters with the coaching during the 2016 State of Origin series for Queensland.

=== 2017 ===
Slater was set to return to action in the Storm's trial match clash against the Canterbury-Bankstown Bulldogs at North Hobart Oval in Hobart, Tasmania. However, coach Craig Bellamy opted to rest him for the opening 2 rounds of the 2017 season and Slater had to wait until round 3 to returning to action. In Round 3, Slater made his successful return against the Brisbane Broncos at AAMI Park, starting from the bench and playing for 52 minutes in the Storm's 14–12 win. The following week, he started at Fullback in the Storm's 22–14 win over the West Tigers playing 80 minutes at Leichhardt Oval, which was his first full-game and away game.

In Round 9, Slater finally broke his long try-scoring drought by scoring 2 tries in a strong man-of-the-match performance in the Storm's 34–22 win over the Dragons. This was the first time he scored a double of tries, since round 9 of the 2015 season. Despite playing consistently well since coming back from injury; Slater was left out of the Australian Kangaroos Test Squad for the International Trans-Tasman ANZAC Test match to New Zealand, with coach Mal Meninga opted to stay loyal and stick with Darius Boyd at Fullback, as well as the players who were part of last year's successful Four Nations Campaign.

Playing his first game in his home state of Queensland in over 1000 days and since round 4 of the 2015 season (which was against the Cowboys at 1300SMILES Stadium in Townsville) in the NRL Indigenous Round and the Round 10 double-header at Suncorp Stadium; Slater continued his consistent form by producing an outstanding performance scoring a try, setting-up 2 tries, making 8 tackles, 16 runs (174 metres), 2 line-breaks and a line-break assist; despite the Storm narrowly losing 36–38 to the Titans. This was also his first game playing at Suncorp Stadium, since round 20 of the 2014 Season which was against the Brisbane Broncos; despite missing Game 3 (the decider) of the 2015 State of Origin series and last year's Game 2 of the 2016 State of Origin series.

With Greg Inglis already sidelined and ruled out of the season with a season-ending knee injury, Slater was expected to return to the Queensland Squad for the 2017 State of Origin series. Despite this, coach Kevin Walters opted to stick with Darius Boyd at Fullback, keep Justin O'Neill at right centre, Corey Oates at left wing, Dane Gagai at right wing and bring in Will Chambers to play left centre; which resulted him being controversially left out of the Game 1 Squad. Following Queensland's Origin Game 1 loss to New South Wales, Slater continued-on with his outstanding consistent performances helping the Storm to victories over the Knights and Sharks. He was then recalled to the Queensland squad along with Johnathan Thurston for game 2, which resulted incumbent Australian Test Fullback Darius Boyd shifting to Centre and Justin O'Neill dropped from the team.

In Game 2 of the Origin Series, Slater produced an outstanding performance setting-up 2 tries (the first try of the game to debutant left winger Valentine Holmes, when he combined with Johnathan Thurston and Darius Boyd; and the game-winning try to right winger Dane Gagai, when he combined with Michael Morgan leading-up to Johnathan Thurston kicking that winning conversion goal) helping QLD to level the series margin to 1-all in the 18–16 win over NSW at ANZ Stadium. Slater remained in the team for game 3 and he produced another outstanding performance in the decider, combining with Storm teammates Cameron Smith, Cooper Cronk and Cameron Munster in QLD's NRL one-club spine combination; to guide QLD to a series win in the 22–6 victory over NSW at Suncorp Stadium.

Playing his first NRL final series appearance since 2014 (despite missing the 2015 and 2016 play-offs due to shoulder injuries) and during the first week of the NRL play-offs final series; Slater played a key part in his side's 18–16 win over the Parramatta Eels at AAMI Park, scoring a try (his 180th NRL career try) in the 2nd half of the game which resulted him drawing level to former Manly Sea Eagles player Steve Menzies as the game's all-time second-equal highest top try-scorer.

With the Storm fresh off their break (after Week 2 of the NRL Final Series) and after their 18–16 victory over the Parramatta Eels (in the first week of the Final Series), Slater featured in the club's Grand Final qualifier match against the Brisbane Broncos scoring 2 tries (both in the second half – the 59th minute and in the 71st minute) in the 30–0 win, allowing the Storm progressing through to the Grand Final and resulted him to move past Steve Menzies as the game's stand-alone second highest top try-scorer (behind another former Manly Sea Eagles player Ken Irvine, who had scored 212 tries).

On 27 September leading into the Grand Final; Slater was awarded the Fullback of the Year Award at the NRL Dally M Awards Event.

Playing in the Grand Final at ANZ Stadium on 1 October; Slater produced an outstanding performance guiding the Melbourne Storm to win the 2017 NRL Premiership (their first Premiership since 2012), beating the North Queensland Cowboys 34–6. Following the game, he received the Clive Churchill Medal as the best player on the field. Two days following the Grand Final victory, Slater was named in the Australian Test Squad for the 2017 Rugby League World Cup Tournament. He also signed a one-year extension, committing to the Melbourne Storm for the 2018 season.

Playing at Fullback in his first international test match for Australia since 2014, Slater scored a try and produced an outstanding man-of-the-match performance in the 18–4 win over England at Melbourne's AAMI Park. The following week, he equaled the record of Bob Fulton and Jarryd Hayne in becoming the Tournament's Top Try-Scorer in Rugby League World Cup history by producing another outstanding performance and scoring his 13th World Cup try (his 24th Test-Career Try) in Australia's 52–6 win over France in Canberra. Coach Mal Meninga opted to rest Slater for the Lebanon clash in Sydney, leading into the play-offs. Slater then returned to the starting line-up at Fullback for the quarter-final game, scoring a try in Australia's 46–0 win against Samoa in Darwin. He then played in Australia's semi-final game against Fiji, scoring 2 tries (which resulted him breaking the all-time World Cup Try-Scoring Record; scoring his 16th World Cup try, as well as his 27th Test try) in the 52–6 win at Suncorp Stadium, guiding the Australians to the World Cup Grand Final. Playing Fullback in the World Cup Grand Final at Suncorp Stadium, Slater featured in Australia's 6–0 win over England, playing an important role and producing another fine performance in the green-and-gold jersey.

=== 2018 ===
Slater started the season, sitting out of the Round 1 game (to the Bulldogs in Perth) due to injury. He returned to the field in Round 2, playing his 300th NRL Career game in the 8–10 loss the West Tigers at AAMI Park.

Slater earned criticism during a home Round 6 game against the Newcastle Knights where he was accused of diving which led second-rower Lachlan Fitzgibbon to be sin-binned. While Slater had the right to go for a quick-tap because he was outside the 10-metre, many disapproved when Fitzgibbon stuck out his hand out on shoulder lightly to make Slater hit the deck. Both fans and social media users were questioning the physics of Slater falling, thus drawing accusations of diving.

Slater also captained the Melbourne Storm for the first time in his NRL Career and during Cameron Smith's suspension absence, against the Manly Sea Eagles in the 4–24 loss during Round 11.

Slater announced his intentions to retire from representative football after the 2018 State of Origin series and was yet to make a decision on playing only at the club level in 2019.

Slater was set to play in the opening game of the Origin series at the MCG; however, he withdrew from the Game 1 squad due to a hamstring injury, in what would have been his last Origin match in Melbourne. He returned from injury in game 2 to play his 30th Origin game, producing an outstanding performance despite Queensland losing game 2 and the series in New South Wales' home game victory at ANZ Stadium.

Following an injury to Queensland teammate and captain Greg Inglis, Slater was named captain for game 3 in his final Origin game. Producing yet another outstanding performance, Slater led Queensland to an 18–12 victory at Suncorp Stadium, thus avoiding a potential 3–0 series whitewash by New South Wales. For his efforts, Slater received the Wally Lewis Medal for Player of the Series, despite having only participated in two of the three Origin games and Queensland's overall series loss.

On 8 August, Slater announced that he would be retiring from the NRL at the end of the 2018 season. He played his final game, a grand final loss to the Sydney Roosters, on 30 September 2018.

== Post-playing career ==
On 10 October 2018, Slater joined Australian Football League (AFL) club St Kilda in a leadership role. He also joined the Nine Network’s NRL commentary team in 2019 On 14 March 2019 Melbourne Storm Announced the renaming of the Northern Stand of AAMI Park to Slater Stand. On 30 August 2019, Slater was chosen at Fullback in the Queensland Maroons team of the decade.

=== Coach of Queensland ===
Billy was selected as the Queensland Maroons Head Coach on 24 September 2021 on a two-year deal. Slater coached the Queensland Maroons to a shock series victory in the 2022 State of Origin series. He followed this up with victory in the 2023 State of Origin series. In September 2023, he signed a three-year extension to coach the team. On 14 August 2026 Slater announced he would resign as coach of the Queensland State of Origin team.

=== Hall of Fame ===
In August 2024, the National Rugby League announced that Slater was an inductee into the National Rugby League Hall of Fame. Slater, who was ascribed Hall of Fame number 122, was amongst eleven male players in the 2024 Class.

== Honours ==
Individual

- 1× Dally M Medal Player of the Year: 2011 :
- 1× Rugby League World Golden Boot Award: 2008
- 3× Dally M Fullback of the Year: 2008, 2011, 2017
- 2× Wally Lewis Medal (State of Origin): 2010, 2018
- 2× Clive Churchill Medal: 2009, 2017
- 1× Melbourne Storm Player of the Year Award: 2009
- 1× Rugby League World Cup Player of the Tournament: 2008
- 1× Dally M Top Try Scorer: 2005 (19, tied with Shaun Berrigan)
- 1× Rugby League World Cup Top Try Scorer: 2008 (7)
- Melbourne Storm Team of the Decade (Fullback): 2007
- National Rugby League Hall of Fame inductee: #122 2024

Team

- 2× NRL Grand Final Winners: 2012, 2017
- 4× Minor Premiership (J. J. Giltinan Shield): 2011, 2016, 2017, 2019
- 3× Minor Premiership (J. J. Giltinan Shield) – Stripped: 2006, 2007, 2008
- 4× NRL Grand Final Runner-Up: 2006, 2008, 2016, 2018
- 3× World Club Challenge Winners: 2010, 2013, 2018
- 8× State of Origin Winners (Queensland): 2008, 2009, 2010, 2011, 2012, 2013, 2015, 2017
- 2× Rugby League World Cup Winners: 2013, 2017
- 1× Rugby League World Cup Runner-up: 2008
- 2× Rugby League Four Nations Winners: 2009, 2011
- 1× Rugby League Four Nations Runner-up: 2010
- 1× World Club Challenge Runner-up: 2008

Coach (Queensland): Winners 2022 2023 2025

== Statistics ==
=== NRL ===
†	Denotes seasons in which Slater won an NRL Premiership
†	Denotes seasons in which Slater won an NRL Premiership that was later stripped

Season	Team	Matches	T	G	GK %	F/G	Pts	W	L	D	W-L %
2003	Melbourne Storm	26	19	0	—	0	76	16	10	0	61.54
2004	Melbourne Storm	22	14	0	—	0	56	12	10	0	54.55
2005	Melbourne Storm	21	20	0	—	0	80	12	9	0	57.14
2006	Melbourne Storm	15	5	0	—	0	20	12	3	0	80.00
2007†	Melbourne Storm	23	12	0	—	0	48	20	3	0	86.96
2008	Melbourne Storm	24	14	0	—	0	56	19	5	0	79.17
2009†	Melbourne Storm	26	18	0	—	0	72	16	9	1	61.54
2010	Melbourne Storm	22	10	0	—	0	40	13	9	0	59.09
2011	Melbourne Storm	24	12	0	—	0	48	19	5	0	79.17
2012†	Melbourne Storm	21	16	0	—	0	64	19	2	0	90.48
2013	Melbourne Storm	24	18	0	—	0	72	16	7	1	66.67
2014	Melbourne Storm	22	12	0	—	0	48	13	9	0	59.09
2015	Melbourne Storm	7	2	0	—	0	8	5	2	0	71.43
2016	Melbourne Storm	1	0	0	—	0	0	1	0	0	100.00
2017†	Melbourne Storm	21	11	0	—	0	44	19	2	0	90.48
2018	Melbourne Storm	20	7	0	—	0	28	12	8	0	60.00
Career totals		319	190	0	—	0	760	224	93	2	70.22

=== State of Origin ===
†	Denotes years in which Slater won a State of Origin series

Season	Team	Matches	T	G	GK %	F/G	Pts	W	L	D	W-L %
2004	Queensland	3	3	0	—	0	12	1	2	0	33.33
2005	Queensland	2	1	0	—	0	4	1	1	0	50.00
2008†	Queensland	3	1	0	—	0	4	2	1	0	66.66
2009†	Queensland	3	2	0	—	0	8	2	1	0	66.66
2010†	Queensland	3	2	0	—	0	8	3	0	0	100.00
2011†	Queensland	3	2	0	—	0	8	2	1	0	66.66
2012†	Queensland	2	0	0	—	0	0	1	1	0	50.00
2013†	Queensland	3	0	0	—	0	0	2	1	0	66.66
2014	Queensland	3	1	0	—	0	4	1	2	0	33.33
2015†	Queensland	2	0	0	—	0	0	1	1	0	50.00
2016	Queensland	0	—	—	—	—	—	—	—	—	—
2017†	Queensland	2	0	0	—	0	0	2	0	0	100.00
2018	Queensland	2	0	0	—	0	0	1	1	0	50.00
Career totals		31	12	0	—	0	48	18	12	0	60.00

=== Australia ===
†	Denotes years in which Slater won a World Cup Title
†	Denotes years in which Slater won a Four Nations Title

Season	Team	Matches	T	G	GK %	F/G	Pts	W	L	D	W-L %
2008	Australia	5	7	0	—	0	28	4	1	0	80.00
2009†	Australia	4	6	0	—	0	24	3	0	1	75.00
2010	Australia	4	3	0	—	0	12	3	1	0	75.00
2011†	Australia	4	2	0	—	0	8	4	0	0	100.00
2012	Australia	2	0	0	—	0	0	2	0	0	100.00
2013†	Australia	5	4	0	—	0	16	5	0	0	100.00
2014	Australia	1	0	0	—	0	0	1	0	0	100.00
2015	Australia	0	—	—	—	—	—	—	—	—	—
2016	Australia	0	—	—	—	—	—	—	—	—	—
2017†	Australia	5	5	0	—	0	20	5	0	0	100.00
Career totals		30	27	0	—	0	128	27	2	1	90.00

== Personal life ==
Slater lives in Melbourne with his wife, Nicole Slater (née Rose). They were married in Cairns in November 2009 and have two children, a daughter, and a son.

Slater participated in the television show Australia's Greatest Athlete and was the winner for both Season 1 (broadcast on Channel 9) and Season 2 (on Channel 7) against a diverse range of athletes such as Olympic gold medalist Steve Hooker, ironman Ky Hurst and V8 Supercar champions Jamie Whincup and Craig Lowndes.

A regular contributor to Canterbury Junior Football Club in Melbourne, Slater also frequently gives up his time to help other Junior Sport Programs around Australia.

== See also ==
- List of players with 100 NRL tries

Sporting positions
Preceded by Amos Roberts (Sydney Roosters)	Dally M Top Try Scorer in the NRL (with Shaun Berrigan); 2005	Succeeded by Nathan Merritt (South Sydney Rabbitohs)
Preceded by Matt Bowen (North Queensland Cowboys)	Dally M Fullback of the Year; 2008	Succeeded by Jarryd Hayne (Parramatta Eels)
Preceded by Inaugural	Australia's Greatest Athlete Winner; 2009, 2010	Succeeded by Quade Cooper
