= Australia's Greatest Athlete =

- Greatest Athlete Australia
- Created by: Du'aine Ladejo
- Presented by: Andrew Voss and Michael Slater (Season 1); Mark Beretta and Tom Williams (Season 2); Mark Beretta and Wendell Sailor (Season 3)
- Country of origin: Australia
- No. of seasons: 3
- No. of episodes: 22

Production
- Running time: 60 minutes
- Production companies: Quiet Storm Productions (2009–2011); 400 PRODUCTIONS (2014)

Original release
- Network: Nine Network (Season 1); Seven Network (Seasons 2-3)
- Release: 2009 – March 2011

Australia's Greatest Athlete is an Australian television program that debuted in 2009. The first season was broadcast on the Nine Network and was hosted by Andrew Voss and Michael Slater, with Ricky Ponting as a sideline commentator. The second season moved to Channel Seven and was hosted by Mark Beretta and Tom Williams, with Ponting returning as a sideline commentator. Season three was hosted by Mark Beretta and Wendell Sailor, while Billy Slater and Mark Webber replaced Ricky Ponting as the sideline commentators.

These three series were sponsored by Rexona, which gave it naming rights and the series was referred to on-air as Rexona Australia's Greatest Athlete.

The show pits eight of Australia's most talented athletes against each other in various sporting challenges and events, earning points for their rankings. The overall winner receives money which will then be donated to a charity of their choice. Melbourne Storm and Australian Kangaroos fullback Billy Slater was the overall champion of the first season, and returned to defend the title for the second season with a 5-point win over runner-up Shannon Eckstein. The third series was won by Queensland Reds and Australian Wallabies five-eighth Quade Cooper with a 95-point win over runner-up Shannon Eckstein. Slater was unable to compete for a threepeat on account of an injury.

Season one was in syndication on Fox Sports 1 on Tuesdays at 6:30 pm, while season two received replays on 7mate.

A fourth season was confirmed through the show's official website and Facebook page, which also announced a new naming sponsor to replace Rexona as well as female and amateur athletes. It was not listed which channel would broadcast the series. Despite the announcement, no fourth season ever eventuated and the show's Facebook page was deleted, effectively cancelling the series.
